

604001–604100 

|-bgcolor=#E9E9E9
| 604001 Iagiellonica ||  ||  || February 24, 2014 || Tincana || M. Żołnowski, M. Kusiak ||  || align=right | 1.3 km || 
|-id=002 bgcolor=#d6d6d6
| 604002 ||  || — || May 18, 2015 || Mount Lemmon || Mount Lemmon Survey || 3:2 || align=right | 3.6 km || 
|-id=003 bgcolor=#d6d6d6
| 604003 ||  || — || August 5, 2005 || Palomar || NEAT ||  || align=right | 4.3 km || 
|-id=004 bgcolor=#E9E9E9
| 604004 ||  || — || March 28, 2015 || Haleakala || Pan-STARRS ||  || align=right | 1.3 km || 
|-id=005 bgcolor=#E9E9E9
| 604005 ||  || — || March 30, 2015 || Haleakala || Pan-STARRS ||  || align=right | 1.2 km || 
|-id=006 bgcolor=#E9E9E9
| 604006 ||  || — || March 8, 2014 || Mount Lemmon || Mount Lemmon Survey ||  || align=right | 1.1 km || 
|-id=007 bgcolor=#E9E9E9
| 604007 ||  || — || January 24, 2014 || Haleakala || Pan-STARRS ||  || align=right | 1.1 km || 
|-id=008 bgcolor=#fefefe
| 604008 ||  || — || October 31, 2008 || Catalina || CSS || H || align=right data-sort-value="0.62" | 620 m || 
|-id=009 bgcolor=#E9E9E9
| 604009 ||  || — || August 3, 2002 || Palomar || NEAT ||  || align=right | 2.7 km || 
|-id=010 bgcolor=#E9E9E9
| 604010 ||  || — || March 30, 2015 || Haleakala || Pan-STARRS ||  || align=right | 1.1 km || 
|-id=011 bgcolor=#E9E9E9
| 604011 ||  || — || April 24, 2015 || Haleakala || Pan-STARRS ||  || align=right | 1.3 km || 
|-id=012 bgcolor=#E9E9E9
| 604012 ||  || — || November 24, 2012 || Kitt Peak || Spacewatch ||  || align=right | 1.9 km || 
|-id=013 bgcolor=#d6d6d6
| 604013 ||  || — || November 18, 2007 || Mount Lemmon || Mount Lemmon Survey ||  || align=right | 2.6 km || 
|-id=014 bgcolor=#E9E9E9
| 604014 ||  || — || May 24, 2006 || Mount Lemmon || Mount Lemmon Survey ||  || align=right | 1.0 km || 
|-id=015 bgcolor=#E9E9E9
| 604015 ||  || — || June 3, 2011 || Mount Lemmon || Mount Lemmon Survey ||  || align=right data-sort-value="0.81" | 810 m || 
|-id=016 bgcolor=#fefefe
| 604016 ||  || — || May 20, 2015 || Haleakala || Pan-STARRS ||  || align=right data-sort-value="0.60" | 600 m || 
|-id=017 bgcolor=#E9E9E9
| 604017 ||  || — || December 22, 2008 || Mount Lemmon || Mount Lemmon Survey ||  || align=right | 1.7 km || 
|-id=018 bgcolor=#E9E9E9
| 604018 ||  || — || November 12, 2012 || Mount Lemmon || Mount Lemmon Survey ||  || align=right | 1.7 km || 
|-id=019 bgcolor=#d6d6d6
| 604019 ||  || — || September 15, 2007 || Mount Lemmon || Mount Lemmon Survey ||  || align=right | 2.9 km || 
|-id=020 bgcolor=#E9E9E9
| 604020 ||  || — || September 11, 2007 || Mount Lemmon || Mount Lemmon Survey ||  || align=right | 1.8 km || 
|-id=021 bgcolor=#E9E9E9
| 604021 ||  || — || September 12, 2007 || Mount Lemmon || Mount Lemmon Survey ||  || align=right data-sort-value="0.96" | 960 m || 
|-id=022 bgcolor=#E9E9E9
| 604022 ||  || — || October 11, 2007 || Catalina || CSS ||  || align=right | 2.4 km || 
|-id=023 bgcolor=#E9E9E9
| 604023 ||  || — || January 2, 2009 || Kitt Peak || Spacewatch ||  || align=right | 1.7 km || 
|-id=024 bgcolor=#E9E9E9
| 604024 ||  || — || October 30, 2007 || Mount Lemmon || Mount Lemmon Survey ||  || align=right | 1.6 km || 
|-id=025 bgcolor=#E9E9E9
| 604025 ||  || — || May 20, 2015 || Haleakala || Pan-STARRS ||  || align=right data-sort-value="0.89" | 890 m || 
|-id=026 bgcolor=#E9E9E9
| 604026 ||  || — || May 9, 2002 || Socorro || LINEAR ||  || align=right | 1.9 km || 
|-id=027 bgcolor=#E9E9E9
| 604027 ||  || — || August 23, 2003 || Palomar || NEAT ||  || align=right data-sort-value="0.91" | 910 m || 
|-id=028 bgcolor=#E9E9E9
| 604028 ||  || — || May 20, 2015 || Haleakala || Pan-STARRS ||  || align=right data-sort-value="0.79" | 790 m || 
|-id=029 bgcolor=#E9E9E9
| 604029 ||  || — || March 18, 2010 || Mount Lemmon || Mount Lemmon Survey ||  || align=right | 1.6 km || 
|-id=030 bgcolor=#E9E9E9
| 604030 ||  || — || March 8, 2005 || Mount Lemmon || Mount Lemmon Survey ||  || align=right | 2.0 km || 
|-id=031 bgcolor=#d6d6d6
| 604031 ||  || — || April 21, 2009 || Mount Lemmon || Mount Lemmon Survey ||  || align=right | 2.6 km || 
|-id=032 bgcolor=#E9E9E9
| 604032 ||  || — || October 19, 2012 || Haleakala || Pan-STARRS ||  || align=right | 1.2 km || 
|-id=033 bgcolor=#E9E9E9
| 604033 ||  || — || May 20, 2015 || Haleakala || Pan-STARRS ||  || align=right | 1.9 km || 
|-id=034 bgcolor=#d6d6d6
| 604034 ||  || — || October 18, 2012 || Haleakala || Pan-STARRS ||  || align=right | 2.5 km || 
|-id=035 bgcolor=#E9E9E9
| 604035 ||  || — || March 6, 2002 || Siding Spring || R. H. McNaught ||  || align=right data-sort-value="0.94" | 940 m || 
|-id=036 bgcolor=#E9E9E9
| 604036 ||  || — || September 22, 2003 || Kitt Peak || Spacewatch ||  || align=right | 2.1 km || 
|-id=037 bgcolor=#E9E9E9
| 604037 ||  || — || October 8, 2012 || Mount Lemmon || Mount Lemmon Survey ||  || align=right data-sort-value="0.88" | 880 m || 
|-id=038 bgcolor=#E9E9E9
| 604038 ||  || — || May 1, 2011 || Haleakala || Pan-STARRS ||  || align=right | 1.2 km || 
|-id=039 bgcolor=#fefefe
| 604039 ||  || — || April 25, 2015 || Haleakala || Pan-STARRS ||  || align=right data-sort-value="0.60" | 600 m || 
|-id=040 bgcolor=#E9E9E9
| 604040 ||  || — || April 25, 2015 || Haleakala || Pan-STARRS ||  || align=right data-sort-value="0.72" | 720 m || 
|-id=041 bgcolor=#d6d6d6
| 604041 ||  || — || February 1, 2003 || Kitt Peak || Spacewatch ||  || align=right | 3.2 km || 
|-id=042 bgcolor=#d6d6d6
| 604042 ||  || — || February 9, 2014 || Mount Lemmon || Mount Lemmon Survey ||  || align=right | 2.8 km || 
|-id=043 bgcolor=#E9E9E9
| 604043 ||  || — || December 31, 2013 || Mount Lemmon || Mount Lemmon Survey ||  || align=right | 1.7 km || 
|-id=044 bgcolor=#E9E9E9
| 604044 ||  || — || December 3, 2000 || Haleakala || AMOS ||  || align=right | 1.2 km || 
|-id=045 bgcolor=#d6d6d6
| 604045 ||  || — || May 15, 2005 || Mount Lemmon || Mount Lemmon Survey ||  || align=right | 3.1 km || 
|-id=046 bgcolor=#d6d6d6
| 604046 ||  || — || November 26, 2012 || Mount Lemmon || Mount Lemmon Survey ||  || align=right | 2.7 km || 
|-id=047 bgcolor=#fefefe
| 604047 ||  || — || April 25, 2015 || Haleakala || Pan-STARRS ||  || align=right data-sort-value="0.76" | 760 m || 
|-id=048 bgcolor=#d6d6d6
| 604048 ||  || — || May 18, 2015 || Mount Lemmon || Mount Lemmon Survey ||  || align=right | 2.5 km || 
|-id=049 bgcolor=#E9E9E9
| 604049 ||  || — || February 14, 2010 || Kitt Peak || Spacewatch ||  || align=right | 1.2 km || 
|-id=050 bgcolor=#d6d6d6
| 604050 ||  || — || March 3, 2009 || Kitt Peak || Spacewatch ||  || align=right | 2.2 km || 
|-id=051 bgcolor=#E9E9E9
| 604051 ||  || — || April 23, 2015 || Haleakala || Pan-STARRS ||  || align=right data-sort-value="0.71" | 710 m || 
|-id=052 bgcolor=#d6d6d6
| 604052 ||  || — || December 31, 2007 || Mount Lemmon || Mount Lemmon Survey ||  || align=right | 2.6 km || 
|-id=053 bgcolor=#d6d6d6
| 604053 ||  || — || May 21, 2015 || Haleakala || Pan-STARRS ||  || align=right | 2.5 km || 
|-id=054 bgcolor=#E9E9E9
| 604054 ||  || — || February 14, 2010 || Mount Lemmon || Mount Lemmon Survey ||  || align=right | 1.3 km || 
|-id=055 bgcolor=#E9E9E9
| 604055 ||  || — || May 21, 2015 || Haleakala || Pan-STARRS ||  || align=right | 1.1 km || 
|-id=056 bgcolor=#fefefe
| 604056 ||  || — || November 13, 2006 || Catalina || CSS ||  || align=right data-sort-value="0.79" | 790 m || 
|-id=057 bgcolor=#d6d6d6
| 604057 ||  || — || February 24, 2014 || Haleakala || Pan-STARRS ||  || align=right | 2.2 km || 
|-id=058 bgcolor=#fefefe
| 604058 ||  || — || March 30, 2015 || Haleakala || Pan-STARRS ||  || align=right data-sort-value="0.67" | 670 m || 
|-id=059 bgcolor=#E9E9E9
| 604059 ||  || — || June 6, 2011 || Haleakala || Pan-STARRS ||  || align=right data-sort-value="0.64" | 640 m || 
|-id=060 bgcolor=#d6d6d6
| 604060 ||  || — || October 21, 2012 || Haleakala || Pan-STARRS ||  || align=right | 1.8 km || 
|-id=061 bgcolor=#fefefe
| 604061 ||  || — || April 23, 2015 || Haleakala || Pan-STARRS ||  || align=right data-sort-value="0.77" | 770 m || 
|-id=062 bgcolor=#d6d6d6
| 604062 ||  || — || November 29, 2013 || Haleakala || Pan-STARRS ||  || align=right | 2.6 km || 
|-id=063 bgcolor=#E9E9E9
| 604063 ||  || — || November 27, 2013 || Haleakala || Pan-STARRS ||  || align=right data-sort-value="0.82" | 820 m || 
|-id=064 bgcolor=#E9E9E9
| 604064 ||  || — || March 30, 2015 || Haleakala || Pan-STARRS ||  || align=right data-sort-value="0.74" | 740 m || 
|-id=065 bgcolor=#E9E9E9
| 604065 ||  || — || November 1, 2008 || Mount Lemmon || Mount Lemmon Survey ||  || align=right | 1.8 km || 
|-id=066 bgcolor=#E9E9E9
| 604066 ||  || — || May 21, 2015 || Haleakala || Pan-STARRS ||  || align=right | 1.7 km || 
|-id=067 bgcolor=#E9E9E9
| 604067 ||  || — || November 7, 2012 || Mount Lemmon || Mount Lemmon Survey ||  || align=right | 1.7 km || 
|-id=068 bgcolor=#E9E9E9
| 604068 ||  || — || May 8, 2010 || Mount Lemmon || Mount Lemmon Survey ||  || align=right | 1.9 km || 
|-id=069 bgcolor=#E9E9E9
| 604069 ||  || — || September 26, 2008 || Kitt Peak || Spacewatch ||  || align=right data-sort-value="0.72" | 720 m || 
|-id=070 bgcolor=#E9E9E9
| 604070 ||  || — || August 19, 2011 || Haleakala || Pan-STARRS ||  || align=right | 1.4 km || 
|-id=071 bgcolor=#E9E9E9
| 604071 ||  || — || October 6, 2012 || Haleakala || Pan-STARRS ||  || align=right data-sort-value="0.98" | 980 m || 
|-id=072 bgcolor=#E9E9E9
| 604072 ||  || — || November 7, 2008 || Mount Lemmon || Mount Lemmon Survey ||  || align=right | 1.2 km || 
|-id=073 bgcolor=#E9E9E9
| 604073 ||  || — || November 26, 2012 || Mount Lemmon || Mount Lemmon Survey ||  || align=right | 1.1 km || 
|-id=074 bgcolor=#E9E9E9
| 604074 ||  || — || July 14, 1999 || Socorro || LINEAR ||  || align=right | 1.5 km || 
|-id=075 bgcolor=#E9E9E9
| 604075 ||  || — || March 28, 2015 || Haleakala || Pan-STARRS ||  || align=right | 2.0 km || 
|-id=076 bgcolor=#E9E9E9
| 604076 ||  || — || February 27, 2015 || Haleakala || Pan-STARRS ||  || align=right | 1.4 km || 
|-id=077 bgcolor=#d6d6d6
| 604077 ||  || — || January 15, 2008 || Mount Lemmon || Mount Lemmon Survey ||  || align=right | 2.5 km || 
|-id=078 bgcolor=#E9E9E9
| 604078 ||  || — || April 25, 2006 || Kitt Peak || Spacewatch ||  || align=right | 1.8 km || 
|-id=079 bgcolor=#E9E9E9
| 604079 ||  || — || April 11, 2015 || Mount Lemmon || Mount Lemmon Survey ||  || align=right | 1.3 km || 
|-id=080 bgcolor=#FA8072
| 604080 ||  || — || September 7, 2008 || Catalina || CSS ||  || align=right data-sort-value="0.64" | 640 m || 
|-id=081 bgcolor=#d6d6d6
| 604081 ||  || — || December 11, 2013 || Haleakala || Pan-STARRS ||  || align=right | 2.8 km || 
|-id=082 bgcolor=#fefefe
| 604082 ||  || — || March 22, 2015 || Mount Lemmon || Mount Lemmon Survey ||  || align=right data-sort-value="0.57" | 570 m || 
|-id=083 bgcolor=#d6d6d6
| 604083 ||  || — || April 18, 1998 || Kitt Peak || Spacewatch ||  || align=right | 3.2 km || 
|-id=084 bgcolor=#E9E9E9
| 604084 ||  || — || May 22, 2015 || Haleakala || Pan-STARRS ||  || align=right | 1.6 km || 
|-id=085 bgcolor=#fefefe
| 604085 ||  || — || October 7, 2012 || Haleakala || Pan-STARRS ||  || align=right data-sort-value="0.66" | 660 m || 
|-id=086 bgcolor=#E9E9E9
| 604086 ||  || — || April 20, 2015 || Haleakala || Pan-STARRS ||  || align=right | 1.4 km || 
|-id=087 bgcolor=#E9E9E9
| 604087 ||  || — || May 12, 2015 || Mount Lemmon || Mount Lemmon Survey ||  || align=right | 1.6 km || 
|-id=088 bgcolor=#E9E9E9
| 604088 ||  || — || May 24, 2015 || Haleakala || Pan-STARRS ||  || align=right data-sort-value="0.78" | 780 m || 
|-id=089 bgcolor=#E9E9E9
| 604089 ||  || — || May 18, 2015 || Haleakala || Pan-STARRS 2 ||  || align=right data-sort-value="0.79" | 790 m || 
|-id=090 bgcolor=#E9E9E9
| 604090 ||  || — || October 22, 2003 || Kitt Peak || Spacewatch ||  || align=right | 2.4 km || 
|-id=091 bgcolor=#d6d6d6
| 604091 ||  || — || November 30, 2006 || Kitt Peak || Spacewatch ||  || align=right | 3.3 km || 
|-id=092 bgcolor=#E9E9E9
| 604092 ||  || — || November 22, 2012 || Kitt Peak || Spacewatch ||  || align=right | 1.6 km || 
|-id=093 bgcolor=#E9E9E9
| 604093 ||  || — || April 18, 2015 || Mount Lemmon || Mount Lemmon Survey ||  || align=right | 1.3 km || 
|-id=094 bgcolor=#E9E9E9
| 604094 ||  || — || April 25, 2015 || Haleakala || Pan-STARRS ||  || align=right | 1.9 km || 
|-id=095 bgcolor=#E9E9E9
| 604095 ||  || — || January 21, 2014 || Catalina || CSS ||  || align=right | 2.3 km || 
|-id=096 bgcolor=#E9E9E9
| 604096 ||  || — || April 25, 2015 || Haleakala || Pan-STARRS ||  || align=right data-sort-value="0.99" | 990 m || 
|-id=097 bgcolor=#E9E9E9
| 604097 ||  || — || October 8, 2008 || Kitt Peak || Spacewatch ||  || align=right | 1.0 km || 
|-id=098 bgcolor=#E9E9E9
| 604098 ||  || — || April 18, 2015 || Haleakala || Pan-STARRS ||  || align=right data-sort-value="0.89" | 890 m || 
|-id=099 bgcolor=#E9E9E9
| 604099 ||  || — || December 13, 2012 || Mount Lemmon || Mount Lemmon Survey ||  || align=right | 1.2 km || 
|-id=100 bgcolor=#E9E9E9
| 604100 ||  || — || May 24, 2015 || Haleakala || Pan-STARRS ||  || align=right | 1.9 km || 
|}

604101–604200 

|-bgcolor=#E9E9E9
| 604101 ||  || — || September 23, 2011 || Kitt Peak || Spacewatch ||  || align=right | 2.0 km || 
|-id=102 bgcolor=#E9E9E9
| 604102 ||  || — || May 10, 2015 || Mount Lemmon || Mount Lemmon Survey ||  || align=right data-sort-value="0.69" | 690 m || 
|-id=103 bgcolor=#E9E9E9
| 604103 ||  || — || June 12, 2011 || Mount Lemmon || Mount Lemmon Survey ||  || align=right | 1.9 km || 
|-id=104 bgcolor=#E9E9E9
| 604104 ||  || — || October 10, 2012 || Haleakala || Pan-STARRS ||  || align=right | 1.8 km || 
|-id=105 bgcolor=#E9E9E9
| 604105 ||  || — || September 23, 2008 || Kitt Peak || Spacewatch ||  || align=right | 1.5 km || 
|-id=106 bgcolor=#E9E9E9
| 604106 ||  || — || May 22, 2006 || Kitt Peak || Spacewatch ||  || align=right | 2.0 km || 
|-id=107 bgcolor=#E9E9E9
| 604107 ||  || — || May 24, 2015 || Haleakala || Pan-STARRS ||  || align=right | 1.2 km || 
|-id=108 bgcolor=#E9E9E9
| 604108 ||  || — || March 14, 2005 || Mount Lemmon || Mount Lemmon Survey ||  || align=right | 1.9 km || 
|-id=109 bgcolor=#E9E9E9
| 604109 ||  || — || May 21, 2015 || Cerro Paranal || M. Altmann, T. Prusti ||  || align=right | 1.3 km || 
|-id=110 bgcolor=#E9E9E9
| 604110 ||  || — || October 10, 2007 || Mount Lemmon || Mount Lemmon Survey ||  || align=right | 1.9 km || 
|-id=111 bgcolor=#d6d6d6
| 604111 ||  || — || March 19, 2009 || Kitt Peak || Spacewatch ||  || align=right | 2.1 km || 
|-id=112 bgcolor=#E9E9E9
| 604112 ||  || — || November 28, 2013 || Mount Lemmon || Mount Lemmon Survey ||  || align=right data-sort-value="0.86" | 860 m || 
|-id=113 bgcolor=#E9E9E9
| 604113 ||  || — || May 21, 2015 || Haleakala || Pan-STARRS ||  || align=right | 1.2 km || 
|-id=114 bgcolor=#E9E9E9
| 604114 ||  || — || November 14, 2012 || Kitt Peak || Spacewatch ||  || align=right data-sort-value="0.69" | 690 m || 
|-id=115 bgcolor=#E9E9E9
| 604115 ||  || — || May 25, 2015 || Haleakala || Pan-STARRS ||  || align=right | 1.8 km || 
|-id=116 bgcolor=#E9E9E9
| 604116 ||  || — || May 25, 2015 || Haleakala || Pan-STARRS ||  || align=right | 1.4 km || 
|-id=117 bgcolor=#d6d6d6
| 604117 ||  || — || January 9, 2014 || Haleakala || Pan-STARRS || Tj (2.99) || align=right | 2.6 km || 
|-id=118 bgcolor=#d6d6d6
| 604118 ||  || — || May 20, 2015 || Haleakala || Pan-STARRS ||  || align=right | 3.0 km || 
|-id=119 bgcolor=#E9E9E9
| 604119 ||  || — || May 21, 2015 || Haleakala || Pan-STARRS ||  || align=right | 1.3 km || 
|-id=120 bgcolor=#E9E9E9
| 604120 ||  || — || May 18, 2015 || Haleakala || Pan-STARRS 2 ||  || align=right | 1.4 km || 
|-id=121 bgcolor=#E9E9E9
| 604121 ||  || — || May 18, 2015 || Haleakala || Pan-STARRS ||  || align=right | 1.0 km || 
|-id=122 bgcolor=#E9E9E9
| 604122 ||  || — || May 24, 2015 || Haleakala || Pan-STARRS ||  || align=right | 1.3 km || 
|-id=123 bgcolor=#fefefe
| 604123 ||  || — || February 28, 2008 || Mount Lemmon || Mount Lemmon Survey ||  || align=right data-sort-value="0.49" | 490 m || 
|-id=124 bgcolor=#E9E9E9
| 604124 ||  || — || May 25, 2015 || Haleakala || Pan-STARRS ||  || align=right data-sort-value="0.97" | 970 m || 
|-id=125 bgcolor=#fefefe
| 604125 ||  || — || May 21, 2015 || Haleakala || Pan-STARRS ||  || align=right data-sort-value="0.66" | 660 m || 
|-id=126 bgcolor=#d6d6d6
| 604126 ||  || — || May 21, 2015 || Haleakala || Pan-STARRS ||  || align=right | 1.6 km || 
|-id=127 bgcolor=#E9E9E9
| 604127 ||  || — || March 28, 2015 || Haleakala || Pan-STARRS ||  || align=right | 1.6 km || 
|-id=128 bgcolor=#E9E9E9
| 604128 ||  || — || February 16, 2015 || Haleakala || Pan-STARRS ||  || align=right | 1.5 km || 
|-id=129 bgcolor=#E9E9E9
| 604129 ||  || — || April 2, 2006 || Mount Lemmon || Mount Lemmon Survey ||  || align=right | 1.1 km || 
|-id=130 bgcolor=#E9E9E9
| 604130 ||  || — || February 15, 2015 || Haleakala || Pan-STARRS ||  || align=right | 1.6 km || 
|-id=131 bgcolor=#E9E9E9
| 604131 ||  || — || March 22, 2015 || Haleakala || Pan-STARRS ||  || align=right data-sort-value="0.92" | 920 m || 
|-id=132 bgcolor=#E9E9E9
| 604132 ||  || — || October 10, 1999 || Kitt Peak || Spacewatch ||  || align=right | 1.5 km || 
|-id=133 bgcolor=#E9E9E9
| 604133 ||  || — || March 22, 2015 || Haleakala || Pan-STARRS ||  || align=right | 1.1 km || 
|-id=134 bgcolor=#E9E9E9
| 604134 ||  || — || March 22, 2015 || Haleakala || Pan-STARRS ||  || align=right | 1.5 km || 
|-id=135 bgcolor=#E9E9E9
| 604135 ||  || — || June 9, 2015 || Haleakala || Pan-STARRS ||  || align=right | 1.6 km || 
|-id=136 bgcolor=#d6d6d6
| 604136 ||  || — || December 13, 2006 || Socorro || LINEAR ||  || align=right | 3.3 km || 
|-id=137 bgcolor=#E9E9E9
| 604137 ||  || — || January 4, 2014 || Haleakala || Pan-STARRS ||  || align=right | 1.2 km || 
|-id=138 bgcolor=#E9E9E9
| 604138 ||  || — || June 7, 2015 || Haleakala || Pan-STARRS ||  || align=right data-sort-value="0.72" | 720 m || 
|-id=139 bgcolor=#E9E9E9
| 604139 ||  || — || October 25, 2008 || Kitt Peak || Spacewatch ||  || align=right data-sort-value="0.99" | 990 m || 
|-id=140 bgcolor=#E9E9E9
| 604140 ||  || — || June 11, 2015 || Haleakala || Pan-STARRS ||  || align=right | 1.5 km || 
|-id=141 bgcolor=#E9E9E9
| 604141 ||  || — || November 2, 2008 || Mount Lemmon || Mount Lemmon Survey ||  || align=right | 1.1 km || 
|-id=142 bgcolor=#E9E9E9
| 604142 ||  || — || September 6, 2002 || Campo Imperatore || CINEOS ||  || align=right | 2.8 km || 
|-id=143 bgcolor=#E9E9E9
| 604143 ||  || — || February 25, 2015 || Haleakala || Pan-STARRS ||  || align=right | 2.0 km || 
|-id=144 bgcolor=#E9E9E9
| 604144 ||  || — || September 13, 2007 || Mount Lemmon || Mount Lemmon Survey ||  || align=right | 2.1 km || 
|-id=145 bgcolor=#fefefe
| 604145 ||  || — || June 13, 2015 || Haleakala || Pan-STARRS ||  || align=right data-sort-value="0.95" | 950 m || 
|-id=146 bgcolor=#E9E9E9
| 604146 ||  || — || February 10, 2014 || Haleakala || Pan-STARRS ||  || align=right | 1.1 km || 
|-id=147 bgcolor=#E9E9E9
| 604147 ||  || — || June 13, 2015 || Haleakala || Pan-STARRS ||  || align=right data-sort-value="0.94" | 940 m || 
|-id=148 bgcolor=#E9E9E9
| 604148 ||  || — || November 2, 2007 || Kitt Peak || Spacewatch ||  || align=right | 1.9 km || 
|-id=149 bgcolor=#E9E9E9
| 604149 ||  || — || October 10, 2002 || Palomar || NEAT ||  || align=right | 2.2 km || 
|-id=150 bgcolor=#E9E9E9
| 604150 ||  || — || June 16, 2015 || Haleakala || Pan-STARRS ||  || align=right data-sort-value="0.84" | 840 m || 
|-id=151 bgcolor=#E9E9E9
| 604151 ||  || — || April 13, 2002 || Palomar || NEAT ||  || align=right | 1.8 km || 
|-id=152 bgcolor=#E9E9E9
| 604152 ||  || — || June 15, 2015 || Haleakala || Pan-STARRS ||  || align=right | 1.5 km || 
|-id=153 bgcolor=#fefefe
| 604153 ||  || — || September 27, 2013 || Piszkesteto || K. Sárneczky || H || align=right data-sort-value="0.61" | 610 m || 
|-id=154 bgcolor=#E9E9E9
| 604154 ||  || — || April 23, 2015 || Haleakala || Pan-STARRS ||  || align=right data-sort-value="0.81" | 810 m || 
|-id=155 bgcolor=#fefefe
| 604155 ||  || — || May 25, 2015 || Catalina || CSS || H || align=right data-sort-value="0.63" | 630 m || 
|-id=156 bgcolor=#d6d6d6
| 604156 ||  || — || June 5, 2015 || Haleakala || Pan-STARRS ||  || align=right | 3.4 km || 
|-id=157 bgcolor=#E9E9E9
| 604157 ||  || — || June 11, 2015 || Haleakala || Pan-STARRS ||  || align=right | 1.9 km || 
|-id=158 bgcolor=#d6d6d6
| 604158 ||  || — || June 15, 2015 || Haleakala || Pan-STARRS ||  || align=right | 1.9 km || 
|-id=159 bgcolor=#fefefe
| 604159 ||  || — || October 26, 2016 || Haleakala || Pan-STARRS ||  || align=right data-sort-value="0.66" | 660 m || 
|-id=160 bgcolor=#E9E9E9
| 604160 ||  || — || June 15, 2015 || Haleakala || Pan-STARRS ||  || align=right | 1.7 km || 
|-id=161 bgcolor=#E9E9E9
| 604161 ||  || — || September 13, 2007 || Mount Lemmon || Mount Lemmon Survey ||  || align=right | 1.0 km || 
|-id=162 bgcolor=#E9E9E9
| 604162 ||  || — || June 11, 2015 || Haleakala || Pan-STARRS ||  || align=right | 1.2 km || 
|-id=163 bgcolor=#E9E9E9
| 604163 ||  || — || March 22, 2015 || Haleakala || Pan-STARRS ||  || align=right | 2.0 km || 
|-id=164 bgcolor=#d6d6d6
| 604164 ||  || — || June 16, 2015 || Haleakala || Pan-STARRS ||  || align=right | 2.2 km || 
|-id=165 bgcolor=#E9E9E9
| 604165 ||  || — || July 25, 2006 || Palomar || NEAT ||  || align=right | 2.5 km || 
|-id=166 bgcolor=#E9E9E9
| 604166 ||  || — || June 16, 2015 || Haleakala || Pan-STARRS ||  || align=right | 2.0 km || 
|-id=167 bgcolor=#E9E9E9
| 604167 ||  || — || May 8, 2006 || Mount Lemmon || Mount Lemmon Survey ||  || align=right | 1.5 km || 
|-id=168 bgcolor=#E9E9E9
| 604168 ||  || — || May 25, 2015 || Haleakala || Pan-STARRS ||  || align=right | 2.0 km || 
|-id=169 bgcolor=#d6d6d6
| 604169 ||  || — || October 8, 2012 || Mount Lemmon || Mount Lemmon Survey ||  || align=right | 2.4 km || 
|-id=170 bgcolor=#E9E9E9
| 604170 ||  || — || March 19, 2001 || Apache Point || SDSS Collaboration ||  || align=right | 1.8 km || 
|-id=171 bgcolor=#E9E9E9
| 604171 ||  || — || November 1, 2008 || Mount Lemmon || Mount Lemmon Survey ||  || align=right | 1.4 km || 
|-id=172 bgcolor=#E9E9E9
| 604172 ||  || — || September 4, 2004 || Palomar || NEAT ||  || align=right | 1.1 km || 
|-id=173 bgcolor=#C2FFFF
| 604173 ||  || — || January 2, 2012 || Mount Lemmon || Mount Lemmon Survey || L4 || align=right | 7.3 km || 
|-id=174 bgcolor=#E9E9E9
| 604174 ||  || — || October 24, 2008 || Kitt Peak || Spacewatch ||  || align=right | 1.3 km || 
|-id=175 bgcolor=#E9E9E9
| 604175 ||  || — || January 11, 2010 || Kitt Peak || Spacewatch ||  || align=right | 1.1 km || 
|-id=176 bgcolor=#E9E9E9
| 604176 ||  || — || January 20, 2015 || Haleakala || Pan-STARRS ||  || align=right | 1.4 km || 
|-id=177 bgcolor=#E9E9E9
| 604177 ||  || — || October 6, 2012 || Mount Lemmon || Mount Lemmon Survey ||  || align=right | 1.5 km || 
|-id=178 bgcolor=#E9E9E9
| 604178 ||  || — || January 23, 2006 || Kitt Peak || Spacewatch ||  || align=right data-sort-value="0.73" | 730 m || 
|-id=179 bgcolor=#E9E9E9
| 604179 ||  || — || May 25, 2015 || Catalina || CSS ||  || align=right | 1.2 km || 
|-id=180 bgcolor=#E9E9E9
| 604180 ||  || — || February 24, 2015 || Haleakala || Pan-STARRS ||  || align=right | 1.3 km || 
|-id=181 bgcolor=#d6d6d6
| 604181 ||  || — || September 30, 2011 || Mount Lemmon || Mount Lemmon Survey ||  || align=right | 3.2 km || 
|-id=182 bgcolor=#d6d6d6
| 604182 ||  || — || April 14, 2015 || Mount Lemmon || Mount Lemmon Survey ||  || align=right | 2.3 km || 
|-id=183 bgcolor=#E9E9E9
| 604183 ||  || — || August 24, 2007 || Kitt Peak || Spacewatch ||  || align=right | 1.3 km || 
|-id=184 bgcolor=#d6d6d6
| 604184 ||  || — || December 19, 2001 || Kitt Peak || Spacewatch ||  || align=right | 3.1 km || 
|-id=185 bgcolor=#d6d6d6
| 604185 ||  || — || May 19, 2015 || Haleakala || Pan-STARRS ||  || align=right | 2.1 km || 
|-id=186 bgcolor=#E9E9E9
| 604186 ||  || — || March 31, 2015 || Haleakala || Pan-STARRS ||  || align=right | 1.3 km || 
|-id=187 bgcolor=#d6d6d6
| 604187 ||  || — || May 18, 2015 || Haleakala || Pan-STARRS ||  || align=right | 1.9 km || 
|-id=188 bgcolor=#d6d6d6
| 604188 ||  || — || June 18, 2015 || Haleakala || Pan-STARRS ||  || align=right | 2.2 km || 
|-id=189 bgcolor=#E9E9E9
| 604189 ||  || — || September 4, 2007 || Mount Lemmon || Mount Lemmon Survey ||  || align=right | 1.4 km || 
|-id=190 bgcolor=#E9E9E9
| 604190 ||  || — || March 9, 2005 || Mount Lemmon || Mount Lemmon Survey ||  || align=right | 2.3 km || 
|-id=191 bgcolor=#E9E9E9
| 604191 ||  || — || February 28, 2014 || Haleakala || Pan-STARRS ||  || align=right | 1.7 km || 
|-id=192 bgcolor=#E9E9E9
| 604192 ||  || — || March 31, 2015 || Haleakala || Pan-STARRS ||  || align=right data-sort-value="0.75" | 750 m || 
|-id=193 bgcolor=#E9E9E9
| 604193 ||  || — || April 18, 2015 || Haleakala || Pan-STARRS ||  || align=right | 1.1 km || 
|-id=194 bgcolor=#E9E9E9
| 604194 ||  || — || June 12, 2011 || Mount Lemmon || Mount Lemmon Survey ||  || align=right | 1.3 km || 
|-id=195 bgcolor=#E9E9E9
| 604195 ||  || — || April 9, 2010 || Mount Lemmon || Mount Lemmon Survey ||  || align=right | 1.4 km || 
|-id=196 bgcolor=#d6d6d6
| 604196 ||  || — || October 24, 2011 || Kitt Peak || Spacewatch ||  || align=right | 2.5 km || 
|-id=197 bgcolor=#FFC2E0
| 604197 ||  || — || June 22, 2015 || Haleakala || Pan-STARRS || APO || align=right data-sort-value="0.34" | 340 m || 
|-id=198 bgcolor=#E9E9E9
| 604198 ||  || — || April 14, 2002 || Socorro || LINEAR ||  || align=right | 1.4 km || 
|-id=199 bgcolor=#E9E9E9
| 604199 ||  || — || March 6, 2014 || Mount Lemmon || Mount Lemmon Survey ||  || align=right | 1.1 km || 
|-id=200 bgcolor=#d6d6d6
| 604200 ||  || — || January 4, 2013 || Cerro Tololo-DECam || CTIO-DECam ||  || align=right | 1.8 km || 
|}

604201–604300 

|-bgcolor=#E9E9E9
| 604201 ||  || — || October 23, 2008 || Kitt Peak || Spacewatch ||  || align=right data-sort-value="0.76" | 760 m || 
|-id=202 bgcolor=#E9E9E9
| 604202 ||  || — || June 18, 2015 || Haleakala || Pan-STARRS ||  || align=right data-sort-value="0.88" | 880 m || 
|-id=203 bgcolor=#E9E9E9
| 604203 ||  || — || April 6, 2014 || Mount Lemmon || Mount Lemmon Survey ||  || align=right | 1.9 km || 
|-id=204 bgcolor=#d6d6d6
| 604204 ||  || — || July 31, 2005 || Palomar || NEAT ||  || align=right | 3.6 km || 
|-id=205 bgcolor=#d6d6d6
| 604205 ||  || — || July 28, 2003 || Palomar || NEAT || 7:4 || align=right | 5.0 km || 
|-id=206 bgcolor=#E9E9E9
| 604206 ||  || — || January 1, 2014 || Kitt Peak || Spacewatch ||  || align=right | 1.9 km || 
|-id=207 bgcolor=#E9E9E9
| 604207 ||  || — || June 10, 2015 || Haleakala || Pan-STARRS ||  || align=right | 1.4 km || 
|-id=208 bgcolor=#d6d6d6
| 604208 ||  || — || June 23, 2015 || Haleakala || Pan-STARRS ||  || align=right | 2.1 km || 
|-id=209 bgcolor=#E9E9E9
| 604209 ||  || — || September 4, 2011 || Haleakala || Pan-STARRS ||  || align=right | 1.8 km || 
|-id=210 bgcolor=#d6d6d6
| 604210 ||  || — || October 23, 2011 || Haleakala || Pan-STARRS ||  || align=right | 1.8 km || 
|-id=211 bgcolor=#d6d6d6
| 604211 ||  || — || December 21, 2012 || Mount Lemmon || Mount Lemmon Survey ||  || align=right | 2.1 km || 
|-id=212 bgcolor=#E9E9E9
| 604212 ||  || — || May 1, 2006 || Kitt Peak || Spacewatch ||  || align=right | 1.4 km || 
|-id=213 bgcolor=#d6d6d6
| 604213 ||  || — || November 24, 2006 || Mauna Kea || Mauna Kea Obs. ||  || align=right | 2.0 km || 
|-id=214 bgcolor=#d6d6d6
| 604214 ||  || — || June 27, 2015 || Haleakala || Pan-STARRS ||  || align=right | 2.1 km || 
|-id=215 bgcolor=#E9E9E9
| 604215 ||  || — || June 5, 2011 || Mount Lemmon || Mount Lemmon Survey ||  || align=right | 1.1 km || 
|-id=216 bgcolor=#E9E9E9
| 604216 ||  || — || April 23, 2014 || Cerro Tololo-DECam || CTIO-DECam ||  || align=right | 1.6 km || 
|-id=217 bgcolor=#E9E9E9
| 604217 ||  || — || October 22, 2011 || Mount Lemmon || Mount Lemmon Survey ||  || align=right | 1.6 km || 
|-id=218 bgcolor=#E9E9E9
| 604218 ||  || — || March 8, 2014 || Mount Lemmon || Mount Lemmon Survey ||  || align=right data-sort-value="0.89" | 890 m || 
|-id=219 bgcolor=#E9E9E9
| 604219 ||  || — || June 28, 2015 || Haleakala || Pan-STARRS ||  || align=right | 2.4 km || 
|-id=220 bgcolor=#d6d6d6
| 604220 ||  || — || May 6, 2014 || Mount Lemmon || Mount Lemmon Survey ||  || align=right | 2.1 km || 
|-id=221 bgcolor=#E9E9E9
| 604221 ||  || — || April 2, 2005 || Kitt Peak || Spacewatch ||  || align=right | 1.5 km || 
|-id=222 bgcolor=#d6d6d6
| 604222 ||  || — || June 27, 2015 || Haleakala || Pan-STARRS ||  || align=right | 2.4 km || 
|-id=223 bgcolor=#E9E9E9
| 604223 ||  || — || January 16, 2009 || Mount Lemmon || Mount Lemmon Survey ||  || align=right | 1.4 km || 
|-id=224 bgcolor=#d6d6d6
| 604224 ||  || — || February 26, 2014 || Haleakala || Pan-STARRS ||  || align=right | 1.5 km || 
|-id=225 bgcolor=#E9E9E9
| 604225 ||  || — || June 18, 2015 || Haleakala || Pan-STARRS ||  || align=right | 1.5 km || 
|-id=226 bgcolor=#d6d6d6
| 604226 ||  || — || June 20, 2015 || Haleakala || Pan-STARRS ||  || align=right | 2.0 km || 
|-id=227 bgcolor=#d6d6d6
| 604227 ||  || — || June 24, 2015 || Haleakala || Pan-STARRS ||  || align=right | 2.6 km || 
|-id=228 bgcolor=#d6d6d6
| 604228 ||  || — || June 26, 2015 || Haleakala || Pan-STARRS ||  || align=right | 2.8 km || 
|-id=229 bgcolor=#d6d6d6
| 604229 ||  || — || March 14, 2013 || Kitt Peak || Spacewatch ||  || align=right | 2.9 km || 
|-id=230 bgcolor=#E9E9E9
| 604230 ||  || — || August 27, 2011 || Haleakala || Pan-STARRS ||  || align=right | 1.3 km || 
|-id=231 bgcolor=#E9E9E9
| 604231 ||  || — || June 18, 2015 || Haleakala || Pan-STARRS ||  || align=right data-sort-value="0.96" | 960 m || 
|-id=232 bgcolor=#E9E9E9
| 604232 ||  || — || January 5, 2013 || Kitt Peak || Spacewatch ||  || align=right data-sort-value="0.83" | 830 m || 
|-id=233 bgcolor=#E9E9E9
| 604233 ||  || — || June 21, 2015 || Mount Lemmon || Mount Lemmon Survey ||  || align=right data-sort-value="0.64" | 640 m || 
|-id=234 bgcolor=#d6d6d6
| 604234 ||  || — || May 7, 2014 || Haleakala || Pan-STARRS ||  || align=right | 2.1 km || 
|-id=235 bgcolor=#d6d6d6
| 604235 ||  || — || June 27, 2015 || Haleakala || Pan-STARRS ||  || align=right | 2.3 km || 
|-id=236 bgcolor=#d6d6d6
| 604236 ||  || — || June 27, 2015 || Haleakala || Pan-STARRS ||  || align=right | 2.2 km || 
|-id=237 bgcolor=#E9E9E9
| 604237 ||  || — || June 26, 2015 || Haleakala || Pan-STARRS ||  || align=right | 1.8 km || 
|-id=238 bgcolor=#E9E9E9
| 604238 ||  || — || October 2, 2003 || La Palma || A. Fitzsimmons ||  || align=right | 1.4 km || 
|-id=239 bgcolor=#d6d6d6
| 604239 ||  || — || June 18, 2015 || Haleakala || Pan-STARRS ||  || align=right | 2.0 km || 
|-id=240 bgcolor=#d6d6d6
| 604240 ||  || — || June 19, 2015 || Haleakala || Pan-STARRS ||  || align=right | 2.3 km || 
|-id=241 bgcolor=#FA8072
| 604241 ||  || — || February 16, 2004 || Kitt Peak || Spacewatch ||  || align=right data-sort-value="0.63" | 630 m || 
|-id=242 bgcolor=#d6d6d6
| 604242 ||  || — || April 15, 2010 || Mount Lemmon || Mount Lemmon Survey ||  || align=right | 2.2 km || 
|-id=243 bgcolor=#E9E9E9
| 604243 ||  || — || September 22, 2011 || Kitt Peak || Spacewatch ||  || align=right | 1.1 km || 
|-id=244 bgcolor=#E9E9E9
| 604244 ||  || — || September 19, 1998 || Apache Point || SDSS Collaboration ||  || align=right | 1.1 km || 
|-id=245 bgcolor=#E9E9E9
| 604245 ||  || — || March 28, 2015 || Haleakala || Pan-STARRS ||  || align=right data-sort-value="0.86" | 860 m || 
|-id=246 bgcolor=#d6d6d6
| 604246 ||  || — || August 23, 2011 || Haleakala || Pan-STARRS ||  || align=right | 2.1 km || 
|-id=247 bgcolor=#d6d6d6
| 604247 ||  || — || September 10, 2010 || Bisei SG Center || N. Hashimoto, T. Sakamoto ||  || align=right | 2.2 km || 
|-id=248 bgcolor=#d6d6d6
| 604248 ||  || — || July 12, 2015 || Haleakala || Pan-STARRS ||  || align=right | 2.3 km || 
|-id=249 bgcolor=#E9E9E9
| 604249 ||  || — || May 30, 2006 || Mount Lemmon || Mount Lemmon Survey ||  || align=right | 2.7 km || 
|-id=250 bgcolor=#E9E9E9
| 604250 ||  || — || October 17, 2012 || Haleakala || Pan-STARRS ||  || align=right | 3.4 km || 
|-id=251 bgcolor=#E9E9E9
| 604251 ||  || — || June 28, 2011 || Mount Lemmon || Mount Lemmon Survey ||  || align=right data-sort-value="0.52" | 520 m || 
|-id=252 bgcolor=#E9E9E9
| 604252 ||  || — || June 23, 1995 || Kitt Peak || Spacewatch ||  || align=right | 1.0 km || 
|-id=253 bgcolor=#d6d6d6
| 604253 ||  || — || April 18, 2009 || Mount Lemmon || Mount Lemmon Survey ||  || align=right | 2.7 km || 
|-id=254 bgcolor=#d6d6d6
| 604254 ||  || — || July 8, 2015 || Haleakala || Pan-STARRS ||  || align=right | 2.1 km || 
|-id=255 bgcolor=#d6d6d6
| 604255 ||  || — || July 12, 2015 || Haleakala || Pan-STARRS ||  || align=right | 1.9 km || 
|-id=256 bgcolor=#d6d6d6
| 604256 ||  || — || July 12, 2015 || Haleakala || Pan-STARRS ||  || align=right | 2.1 km || 
|-id=257 bgcolor=#E9E9E9
| 604257 ||  || — || July 5, 2011 || Haleakala || Pan-STARRS ||  || align=right | 1.0 km || 
|-id=258 bgcolor=#d6d6d6
| 604258 ||  || — || August 6, 2005 || Palomar || NEAT ||  || align=right | 2.8 km || 
|-id=259 bgcolor=#d6d6d6
| 604259 ||  || — || July 18, 2015 || Haleakala || Pan-STARRS ||  || align=right | 2.1 km || 
|-id=260 bgcolor=#d6d6d6
| 604260 ||  || — || August 30, 2005 || Kitt Peak || Spacewatch ||  || align=right | 2.4 km || 
|-id=261 bgcolor=#d6d6d6
| 604261 ||  || — || August 30, 2005 || Palomar || NEAT ||  || align=right | 2.8 km || 
|-id=262 bgcolor=#E9E9E9
| 604262 ||  || — || April 6, 2014 || Mount Lemmon || Mount Lemmon Survey ||  || align=right | 2.2 km || 
|-id=263 bgcolor=#fefefe
| 604263 ||  || — || October 9, 2004 || Kitt Peak || Spacewatch ||  || align=right data-sort-value="0.85" | 850 m || 
|-id=264 bgcolor=#d6d6d6
| 604264 ||  || — || July 18, 2015 || Haleakala || Pan-STARRS ||  || align=right | 2.1 km || 
|-id=265 bgcolor=#E9E9E9
| 604265 ||  || — || June 20, 2015 || Haleakala || Pan-STARRS 2 ||  || align=right | 1.2 km || 
|-id=266 bgcolor=#E9E9E9
| 604266 ||  || — || July 20, 2015 || Cerro Paranal || M. Altmann, T. Prusti ||  || align=right | 1.9 km || 
|-id=267 bgcolor=#d6d6d6
| 604267 ||  || — || May 24, 2014 || Haleakala || Pan-STARRS ||  || align=right | 2.7 km || 
|-id=268 bgcolor=#d6d6d6
| 604268 ||  || — || February 5, 2013 || Mount Lemmon || Mount Lemmon Survey ||  || align=right | 2.1 km || 
|-id=269 bgcolor=#E9E9E9
| 604269 ||  || — || September 24, 2011 || Haleakala || Pan-STARRS ||  || align=right | 1.7 km || 
|-id=270 bgcolor=#d6d6d6
| 604270 ||  || — || January 10, 2007 || Kitt Peak || Spacewatch ||  || align=right | 2.3 km || 
|-id=271 bgcolor=#E9E9E9
| 604271 ||  || — || October 16, 2002 || Palomar || NEAT ||  || align=right | 1.5 km || 
|-id=272 bgcolor=#E9E9E9
| 604272 ||  || — || June 27, 2015 || Haleakala || Pan-STARRS ||  || align=right | 1.7 km || 
|-id=273 bgcolor=#E9E9E9
| 604273 ||  || — || June 13, 2015 || Haleakala || Pan-STARRS ||  || align=right | 1.5 km || 
|-id=274 bgcolor=#E9E9E9
| 604274 ||  || — || May 7, 2005 || Mount Lemmon || Mount Lemmon Survey ||  || align=right | 2.5 km || 
|-id=275 bgcolor=#E9E9E9
| 604275 ||  || — || July 19, 2015 || Haleakala || Pan-STARRS 2 ||  || align=right | 1.4 km || 
|-id=276 bgcolor=#d6d6d6
| 604276 ||  || — || April 9, 2003 || Kitt Peak || Spacewatch ||  || align=right | 2.3 km || 
|-id=277 bgcolor=#d6d6d6
| 604277 ||  || — || May 8, 2014 || Haleakala || Pan-STARRS ||  || align=right | 2.4 km || 
|-id=278 bgcolor=#d6d6d6
| 604278 ||  || — || July 26, 2015 || Haleakala || Pan-STARRS ||  || align=right | 2.0 km || 
|-id=279 bgcolor=#E9E9E9
| 604279 ||  || — || December 28, 2003 || Kitt Peak || Spacewatch ||  || align=right | 1.5 km || 
|-id=280 bgcolor=#d6d6d6
| 604280 ||  || — || April 29, 2014 || Haleakala || Pan-STARRS ||  || align=right | 1.9 km || 
|-id=281 bgcolor=#d6d6d6
| 604281 ||  || — || November 24, 2011 || Mount Lemmon || Mount Lemmon Survey ||  || align=right | 2.4 km || 
|-id=282 bgcolor=#d6d6d6
| 604282 ||  || — || July 26, 2015 || Haleakala || Pan-STARRS ||  || align=right | 2.6 km || 
|-id=283 bgcolor=#d6d6d6
| 604283 ||  || — || July 26, 2015 || Haleakala || Pan-STARRS ||  || align=right | 2.3 km || 
|-id=284 bgcolor=#E9E9E9
| 604284 ||  || — || July 26, 2015 || Haleakala || Pan-STARRS ||  || align=right | 1.6 km || 
|-id=285 bgcolor=#E9E9E9
| 604285 ||  || — || August 14, 2006 || Siding Spring || SSS ||  || align=right | 2.3 km || 
|-id=286 bgcolor=#d6d6d6
| 604286 ||  || — || October 5, 2005 || Catalina || CSS ||  || align=right | 2.8 km || 
|-id=287 bgcolor=#E9E9E9
| 604287 ||  || — || June 22, 2015 || Haleakala || Pan-STARRS ||  || align=right | 1.9 km || 
|-id=288 bgcolor=#d6d6d6
| 604288 ||  || — || February 3, 2013 || Haleakala || Pan-STARRS ||  || align=right | 2.5 km || 
|-id=289 bgcolor=#d6d6d6
| 604289 ||  || — || November 2, 2011 || Mount Lemmon || Mount Lemmon Survey ||  || align=right | 1.9 km || 
|-id=290 bgcolor=#E9E9E9
| 604290 ||  || — || August 27, 2006 || Kitt Peak || Spacewatch ||  || align=right | 2.0 km || 
|-id=291 bgcolor=#E9E9E9
| 604291 ||  || — || July 25, 2015 || Haleakala || Pan-STARRS ||  || align=right | 1.9 km || 
|-id=292 bgcolor=#FA8072
| 604292 ||  || — || January 24, 2014 || Haleakala || Pan-STARRS || H || align=right data-sort-value="0.38" | 380 m || 
|-id=293 bgcolor=#d6d6d6
| 604293 ||  || — || July 24, 2015 || Haleakala || Pan-STARRS ||  || align=right | 2.0 km || 
|-id=294 bgcolor=#d6d6d6
| 604294 ||  || — || July 25, 2015 || Haleakala || Pan-STARRS ||  || align=right | 2.4 km || 
|-id=295 bgcolor=#d6d6d6
| 604295 ||  || — || December 4, 2010 || Mount Lemmon || Mount Lemmon Survey ||  || align=right | 3.5 km || 
|-id=296 bgcolor=#d6d6d6
| 604296 ||  || — || November 24, 2011 || Mount Lemmon || Mount Lemmon Survey ||  || align=right | 2.4 km || 
|-id=297 bgcolor=#E9E9E9
| 604297 ||  || — || March 9, 2005 || Kitt Peak || Spacewatch ||  || align=right | 2.0 km || 
|-id=298 bgcolor=#d6d6d6
| 604298 ||  || — || July 19, 2015 || Haleakala || Pan-STARRS ||  || align=right | 2.3 km || 
|-id=299 bgcolor=#d6d6d6
| 604299 ||  || — || July 23, 2015 || Haleakala || Pan-STARRS ||  || align=right | 2.2 km || 
|-id=300 bgcolor=#d6d6d6
| 604300 ||  || — || September 11, 2004 || Kitt Peak || Spacewatch ||  || align=right | 1.9 km || 
|}

604301–604400 

|-bgcolor=#d6d6d6
| 604301 ||  || — || July 23, 2015 || Haleakala || Pan-STARRS ||  || align=right | 2.0 km || 
|-id=302 bgcolor=#d6d6d6
| 604302 ||  || — || September 18, 2010 || Mount Lemmon || Mount Lemmon Survey ||  || align=right | 2.6 km || 
|-id=303 bgcolor=#d6d6d6
| 604303 ||  || — || April 6, 2008 || Mount Lemmon || Mount Lemmon Survey ||  || align=right | 2.1 km || 
|-id=304 bgcolor=#d6d6d6
| 604304 ||  || — || March 10, 2008 || Kitt Peak || Spacewatch ||  || align=right | 2.1 km || 
|-id=305 bgcolor=#d6d6d6
| 604305 ||  || — || December 25, 2011 || Piszkesteto || K. Sárneczky ||  || align=right | 2.8 km || 
|-id=306 bgcolor=#d6d6d6
| 604306 ||  || — || December 2, 2010 || Mount Lemmon || Mount Lemmon Survey ||  || align=right | 2.5 km || 
|-id=307 bgcolor=#E9E9E9
| 604307 ||  || — || October 20, 2011 || Mount Lemmon || Mount Lemmon Survey ||  || align=right data-sort-value="0.72" | 720 m || 
|-id=308 bgcolor=#d6d6d6
| 604308 ||  || — || July 25, 2015 || Haleakala || Pan-STARRS ||  || align=right | 2.7 km || 
|-id=309 bgcolor=#d6d6d6
| 604309 ||  || — || April 29, 2014 || ESA OGS || ESA OGS ||  || align=right | 2.3 km || 
|-id=310 bgcolor=#E9E9E9
| 604310 ||  || — || July 26, 2015 || Haleakala || Pan-STARRS ||  || align=right | 1.2 km || 
|-id=311 bgcolor=#d6d6d6
| 604311 ||  || — || June 29, 2015 || Haleakala || Pan-STARRS ||  || align=right | 1.9 km || 
|-id=312 bgcolor=#d6d6d6
| 604312 ||  || — || September 11, 2010 || Mount Lemmon || Mount Lemmon Survey ||  || align=right | 2.3 km || 
|-id=313 bgcolor=#d6d6d6
| 604313 ||  || — || July 25, 2015 || Haleakala || Pan-STARRS ||  || align=right | 2.8 km || 
|-id=314 bgcolor=#d6d6d6
| 604314 ||  || — || July 23, 2015 || Haleakala || Pan-STARRS ||  || align=right | 2.8 km || 
|-id=315 bgcolor=#E9E9E9
| 604315 ||  || — || July 26, 2015 || Haleakala || Pan-STARRS ||  || align=right | 1.4 km || 
|-id=316 bgcolor=#d6d6d6
| 604316 ||  || — || July 26, 2015 || Haleakala || Pan-STARRS ||  || align=right | 2.3 km || 
|-id=317 bgcolor=#d6d6d6
| 604317 ||  || — || July 25, 2015 || Haleakala || Pan-STARRS ||  || align=right | 2.5 km || 
|-id=318 bgcolor=#d6d6d6
| 604318 ||  || — || July 25, 2015 || Haleakala || Pan-STARRS ||  || align=right | 2.2 km || 
|-id=319 bgcolor=#d6d6d6
| 604319 ||  || — || January 25, 2012 || Haleakala || Pan-STARRS ||  || align=right | 2.3 km || 
|-id=320 bgcolor=#d6d6d6
| 604320 ||  || — || November 2, 2010 || Mount Lemmon || Mount Lemmon Survey ||  || align=right | 2.4 km || 
|-id=321 bgcolor=#d6d6d6
| 604321 ||  || — || July 25, 2015 || Haleakala || Pan-STARRS ||  || align=right | 2.4 km || 
|-id=322 bgcolor=#d6d6d6
| 604322 ||  || — || July 19, 2015 || Haleakala || Pan-STARRS ||  || align=right | 2.3 km || 
|-id=323 bgcolor=#d6d6d6
| 604323 ||  || — || July 25, 2015 || Haleakala || Pan-STARRS ||  || align=right | 2.6 km || 
|-id=324 bgcolor=#E9E9E9
| 604324 ||  || — || July 28, 2015 || Haleakala || Pan-STARRS ||  || align=right | 2.1 km || 
|-id=325 bgcolor=#d6d6d6
| 604325 ||  || — || July 25, 2015 || Haleakala || Pan-STARRS ||  || align=right | 2.2 km || 
|-id=326 bgcolor=#d6d6d6
| 604326 ||  || — || July 24, 2015 || Haleakala || Pan-STARRS ||  || align=right | 2.1 km || 
|-id=327 bgcolor=#E9E9E9
| 604327 ||  || — || July 25, 2015 || Haleakala || Pan-STARRS ||  || align=right | 1.6 km || 
|-id=328 bgcolor=#d6d6d6
| 604328 ||  || — || July 23, 2015 || Haleakala || Pan-STARRS ||  || align=right | 1.7 km || 
|-id=329 bgcolor=#fefefe
| 604329 ||  || — || July 28, 2015 || Haleakala || Pan-STARRS ||  || align=right data-sort-value="0.69" | 690 m || 
|-id=330 bgcolor=#E9E9E9
| 604330 ||  || — || July 19, 2015 || Haleakala || Pan-STARRS ||  || align=right | 1.6 km || 
|-id=331 bgcolor=#E9E9E9
| 604331 ||  || — || November 3, 2011 || Mount Lemmon || Mount Lemmon Survey ||  || align=right | 1.5 km || 
|-id=332 bgcolor=#E9E9E9
| 604332 ||  || — || August 27, 2011 || Haleakala || Pan-STARRS ||  || align=right | 1.1 km || 
|-id=333 bgcolor=#E9E9E9
| 604333 ||  || — || October 17, 2007 || Mount Lemmon || Mount Lemmon Survey ||  || align=right | 1.3 km || 
|-id=334 bgcolor=#E9E9E9
| 604334 ||  || — || March 28, 2014 || Mount Lemmon || Mount Lemmon Survey ||  || align=right | 2.1 km || 
|-id=335 bgcolor=#d6d6d6
| 604335 ||  || — || April 30, 2014 || Haleakala || Pan-STARRS ||  || align=right | 2.4 km || 
|-id=336 bgcolor=#E9E9E9
| 604336 ||  || — || September 26, 2006 || Kitt Peak || Spacewatch ||  || align=right | 1.5 km || 
|-id=337 bgcolor=#d6d6d6
| 604337 ||  || — || December 29, 2005 || Mount Lemmon || Mount Lemmon Survey ||  || align=right | 2.5 km || 
|-id=338 bgcolor=#fefefe
| 604338 ||  || — || April 3, 2011 || Haleakala || Pan-STARRS ||  || align=right data-sort-value="0.50" | 500 m || 
|-id=339 bgcolor=#d6d6d6
| 604339 ||  || — || September 26, 2000 || Kitt Peak || Spacewatch ||  || align=right | 2.5 km || 
|-id=340 bgcolor=#E9E9E9
| 604340 ||  || — || June 25, 2015 || Haleakala || Pan-STARRS ||  || align=right | 1.9 km || 
|-id=341 bgcolor=#E9E9E9
| 604341 ||  || — || August 24, 2011 || Haleakala || Pan-STARRS ||  || align=right | 1.1 km || 
|-id=342 bgcolor=#E9E9E9
| 604342 ||  || — || August 8, 2015 || Haleakala || Pan-STARRS ||  || align=right | 1.7 km || 
|-id=343 bgcolor=#E9E9E9
| 604343 ||  || — || September 28, 2011 || Kitt Peak || Spacewatch ||  || align=right | 1.3 km || 
|-id=344 bgcolor=#E9E9E9
| 604344 ||  || — || August 30, 2011 || Piszkesteto || K. Sárneczky ||  || align=right data-sort-value="0.53" | 530 m || 
|-id=345 bgcolor=#d6d6d6
| 604345 ||  || — || September 24, 2011 || Haleakala || Pan-STARRS ||  || align=right | 2.9 km || 
|-id=346 bgcolor=#d6d6d6
| 604346 ||  || — || March 24, 2014 || Haleakala || Pan-STARRS ||  || align=right | 1.7 km || 
|-id=347 bgcolor=#E9E9E9
| 604347 ||  || — || July 12, 2015 || Haleakala || Pan-STARRS ||  || align=right | 1.1 km || 
|-id=348 bgcolor=#d6d6d6
| 604348 ||  || — || April 30, 2009 || Kitt Peak || Spacewatch ||  || align=right | 2.3 km || 
|-id=349 bgcolor=#E9E9E9
| 604349 ||  || — || January 19, 2013 || Kitt Peak || Spacewatch ||  || align=right | 1.8 km || 
|-id=350 bgcolor=#E9E9E9
| 604350 ||  || — || September 14, 2007 || Mount Lemmon || Mount Lemmon Survey ||  || align=right | 1.5 km || 
|-id=351 bgcolor=#d6d6d6
| 604351 ||  || — || April 9, 2003 || Palomar || NEAT ||  || align=right | 2.6 km || 
|-id=352 bgcolor=#E9E9E9
| 604352 ||  || — || August 9, 2015 || Haleakala || Pan-STARRS ||  || align=right | 1.6 km || 
|-id=353 bgcolor=#d6d6d6
| 604353 ||  || — || October 31, 2005 || Kitt Peak || Spacewatch ||  || align=right | 2.6 km || 
|-id=354 bgcolor=#d6d6d6
| 604354 ||  || — || May 3, 2014 || Mount Lemmon || Mount Lemmon Survey ||  || align=right | 2.5 km || 
|-id=355 bgcolor=#d6d6d6
| 604355 ||  || — || January 27, 2012 || Mount Lemmon || Mount Lemmon Survey ||  || align=right | 2.5 km || 
|-id=356 bgcolor=#d6d6d6
| 604356 ||  || — || July 12, 2015 || Haleakala || Pan-STARRS ||  || align=right | 1.9 km || 
|-id=357 bgcolor=#d6d6d6
| 604357 ||  || — || May 9, 2014 || Haleakala || Pan-STARRS ||  || align=right | 2.3 km || 
|-id=358 bgcolor=#d6d6d6
| 604358 ||  || — || April 2, 2009 || Kitt Peak || Spacewatch ||  || align=right | 1.7 km || 
|-id=359 bgcolor=#d6d6d6
| 604359 ||  || — || June 18, 2015 || Haleakala || Pan-STARRS ||  || align=right | 1.7 km || 
|-id=360 bgcolor=#d6d6d6
| 604360 ||  || — || January 11, 2008 || Kitt Peak || Spacewatch ||  || align=right | 1.7 km || 
|-id=361 bgcolor=#d6d6d6
| 604361 ||  || — || October 23, 2011 || Haleakala || Pan-STARRS ||  || align=right | 2.0 km || 
|-id=362 bgcolor=#E9E9E9
| 604362 ||  || — || September 20, 2011 || Kitt Peak || Spacewatch ||  || align=right | 1.8 km || 
|-id=363 bgcolor=#d6d6d6
| 604363 ||  || — || September 14, 2005 || Kitt Peak || Spacewatch ||  || align=right | 2.9 km || 
|-id=364 bgcolor=#E9E9E9
| 604364 ||  || — || February 20, 2009 || Kitt Peak || Spacewatch ||  || align=right | 1.7 km || 
|-id=365 bgcolor=#d6d6d6
| 604365 ||  || — || September 14, 2006 || Kitt Peak || Spacewatch ||  || align=right | 2.2 km || 
|-id=366 bgcolor=#E9E9E9
| 604366 ||  || — || February 16, 2004 || Kitt Peak || Spacewatch ||  || align=right | 1.9 km || 
|-id=367 bgcolor=#fefefe
| 604367 ||  || — || February 28, 2014 || Haleakala || Pan-STARRS ||  || align=right data-sort-value="0.62" | 620 m || 
|-id=368 bgcolor=#E9E9E9
| 604368 ||  || — || January 20, 2009 || Kitt Peak || Spacewatch ||  || align=right | 1.5 km || 
|-id=369 bgcolor=#d6d6d6
| 604369 ||  || — || October 20, 1995 || Kitt Peak || Spacewatch ||  || align=right | 2.0 km || 
|-id=370 bgcolor=#E9E9E9
| 604370 ||  || — || August 19, 2006 || Kitt Peak || Spacewatch ||  || align=right | 1.8 km || 
|-id=371 bgcolor=#d6d6d6
| 604371 ||  || — || March 23, 2004 || Kitt Peak || Spacewatch ||  || align=right | 1.8 km || 
|-id=372 bgcolor=#d6d6d6
| 604372 ||  || — || December 31, 2007 || Kitt Peak || Spacewatch ||  || align=right | 1.8 km || 
|-id=373 bgcolor=#E9E9E9
| 604373 ||  || — || November 9, 1999 || Kitt Peak || Spacewatch ||  || align=right data-sort-value="0.87" | 870 m || 
|-id=374 bgcolor=#E9E9E9
| 604374 ||  || — || October 21, 2007 || Kitt Peak || Spacewatch ||  || align=right | 1.2 km || 
|-id=375 bgcolor=#d6d6d6
| 604375 ||  || — || April 5, 2014 || Haleakala || Pan-STARRS ||  || align=right | 2.0 km || 
|-id=376 bgcolor=#d6d6d6
| 604376 ||  || — || February 13, 2008 || Kitt Peak || Spacewatch ||  || align=right | 2.2 km || 
|-id=377 bgcolor=#d6d6d6
| 604377 ||  || — || July 25, 2015 || Haleakala || Pan-STARRS ||  || align=right | 1.9 km || 
|-id=378 bgcolor=#d6d6d6
| 604378 ||  || — || April 21, 2014 || Mount Lemmon || Mount Lemmon Survey ||  || align=right | 2.4 km || 
|-id=379 bgcolor=#d6d6d6
| 604379 ||  || — || May 7, 2014 || Haleakala || Pan-STARRS ||  || align=right | 2.6 km || 
|-id=380 bgcolor=#E9E9E9
| 604380 ||  || — || August 10, 2015 || Haleakala || Pan-STARRS ||  || align=right | 1.6 km || 
|-id=381 bgcolor=#d6d6d6
| 604381 ||  || — || August 9, 2005 || Cerro Tololo || Cerro Tololo Obs. ||  || align=right | 1.8 km || 
|-id=382 bgcolor=#d6d6d6
| 604382 ||  || — || August 10, 2015 || Haleakala || Pan-STARRS ||  || align=right | 1.8 km || 
|-id=383 bgcolor=#E9E9E9
| 604383 ||  || — || January 22, 2013 || Mount Lemmon || Mount Lemmon Survey ||  || align=right | 1.2 km || 
|-id=384 bgcolor=#E9E9E9
| 604384 ||  || — || January 15, 2013 || ESA OGS || ESA OGS ||  || align=right | 1.8 km || 
|-id=385 bgcolor=#fefefe
| 604385 ||  || — || January 28, 2007 || Kitt Peak || Spacewatch ||  || align=right data-sort-value="0.67" | 670 m || 
|-id=386 bgcolor=#d6d6d6
| 604386 ||  || — || May 8, 2014 || Haleakala || Pan-STARRS ||  || align=right | 1.9 km || 
|-id=387 bgcolor=#d6d6d6
| 604387 ||  || — || July 24, 2015 || Haleakala || Pan-STARRS ||  || align=right | 1.9 km || 
|-id=388 bgcolor=#d6d6d6
| 604388 ||  || — || October 1, 2005 || Mount Lemmon || Mount Lemmon Survey ||  || align=right | 2.1 km || 
|-id=389 bgcolor=#E9E9E9
| 604389 ||  || — || August 27, 2006 || Kitt Peak || Spacewatch ||  || align=right | 1.5 km || 
|-id=390 bgcolor=#d6d6d6
| 604390 ||  || — || September 17, 2010 || Mount Lemmon || Mount Lemmon Survey ||  || align=right | 2.2 km || 
|-id=391 bgcolor=#d6d6d6
| 604391 ||  || — || December 23, 2012 || Haleakala || Pan-STARRS ||  || align=right | 2.2 km || 
|-id=392 bgcolor=#d6d6d6
| 604392 ||  || — || September 2, 2010 || Mount Lemmon || Mount Lemmon Survey ||  || align=right | 1.9 km || 
|-id=393 bgcolor=#E9E9E9
| 604393 ||  || — || April 17, 1998 || Kitt Peak || Spacewatch ||  || align=right data-sort-value="0.91" | 910 m || 
|-id=394 bgcolor=#E9E9E9
| 604394 ||  || — || February 11, 2004 || Kitt Peak || Spacewatch ||  || align=right | 1.8 km || 
|-id=395 bgcolor=#d6d6d6
| 604395 ||  || — || May 24, 2014 || Haleakala || Pan-STARRS ||  || align=right | 1.9 km || 
|-id=396 bgcolor=#d6d6d6
| 604396 ||  || — || October 26, 2011 || Haleakala || Pan-STARRS ||  || align=right | 2.0 km || 
|-id=397 bgcolor=#d6d6d6
| 604397 ||  || — || May 20, 2014 || Haleakala || Pan-STARRS ||  || align=right | 2.3 km || 
|-id=398 bgcolor=#d6d6d6
| 604398 ||  || — || June 17, 2015 || Haleakala || Pan-STARRS ||  || align=right | 2.4 km || 
|-id=399 bgcolor=#d6d6d6
| 604399 ||  || — || April 5, 2014 || Haleakala || Pan-STARRS ||  || align=right | 2.2 km || 
|-id=400 bgcolor=#d6d6d6
| 604400 ||  || — || May 7, 2014 || Haleakala || Pan-STARRS ||  || align=right | 2.5 km || 
|}

604401–604500 

|-bgcolor=#d6d6d6
| 604401 ||  || — || April 5, 2008 || Mount Lemmon || Mount Lemmon Survey ||  || align=right | 3.1 km || 
|-id=402 bgcolor=#d6d6d6
| 604402 ||  || — || August 10, 2015 || Haleakala || Pan-STARRS ||  || align=right | 2.1 km || 
|-id=403 bgcolor=#d6d6d6
| 604403 ||  || — || August 10, 2015 || Haleakala || Pan-STARRS ||  || align=right | 2.7 km || 
|-id=404 bgcolor=#d6d6d6
| 604404 ||  || — || June 25, 2015 || Haleakala || Pan-STARRS ||  || align=right | 2.3 km || 
|-id=405 bgcolor=#d6d6d6
| 604405 ||  || — || January 10, 2013 || Haleakala || Pan-STARRS ||  || align=right | 3.3 km || 
|-id=406 bgcolor=#E9E9E9
| 604406 ||  || — || August 25, 2011 || Piszkesteto || K. Sárneczky ||  || align=right | 1.4 km || 
|-id=407 bgcolor=#d6d6d6
| 604407 ||  || — || December 31, 2011 || Mount Lemmon || Mount Lemmon Survey ||  || align=right | 2.8 km || 
|-id=408 bgcolor=#d6d6d6
| 604408 ||  || — || February 11, 2008 || Mount Lemmon || Mount Lemmon Survey ||  || align=right | 2.7 km || 
|-id=409 bgcolor=#fefefe
| 604409 ||  || — || October 24, 2009 || Kitt Peak || Spacewatch ||  || align=right data-sort-value="0.52" | 520 m || 
|-id=410 bgcolor=#d6d6d6
| 604410 ||  || — || February 2, 2008 || Mount Lemmon || Mount Lemmon Survey ||  || align=right | 2.3 km || 
|-id=411 bgcolor=#d6d6d6
| 604411 ||  || — || March 24, 2014 || Haleakala || Pan-STARRS ||  || align=right | 2.3 km || 
|-id=412 bgcolor=#E9E9E9
| 604412 ||  || — || December 17, 2003 || Kitt Peak || Spacewatch ||  || align=right | 2.1 km || 
|-id=413 bgcolor=#d6d6d6
| 604413 ||  || — || April 5, 2014 || Haleakala || Pan-STARRS ||  || align=right | 1.7 km || 
|-id=414 bgcolor=#d6d6d6
| 604414 ||  || — || October 25, 2011 || Kitt Peak || Spacewatch ||  || align=right | 2.0 km || 
|-id=415 bgcolor=#d6d6d6
| 604415 ||  || — || November 12, 2005 || Kitt Peak || Spacewatch ||  || align=right | 2.1 km || 
|-id=416 bgcolor=#E9E9E9
| 604416 ||  || — || May 7, 2006 || Mount Lemmon || Mount Lemmon Survey ||  || align=right | 1.3 km || 
|-id=417 bgcolor=#d6d6d6
| 604417 ||  || — || December 16, 2011 || Mount Lemmon || Mount Lemmon Survey ||  || align=right | 2.1 km || 
|-id=418 bgcolor=#d6d6d6
| 604418 ||  || — || April 24, 2014 || Haleakala || Pan-STARRS ||  || align=right | 2.4 km || 
|-id=419 bgcolor=#E9E9E9
| 604419 ||  || — || June 11, 2015 || Haleakala || Pan-STARRS ||  || align=right | 3.0 km || 
|-id=420 bgcolor=#d6d6d6
| 604420 ||  || — || May 3, 2014 || Mount Lemmon || Mount Lemmon Survey ||  || align=right | 1.9 km || 
|-id=421 bgcolor=#d6d6d6
| 604421 ||  || — || June 18, 2015 || Haleakala || Pan-STARRS ||  || align=right | 1.5 km || 
|-id=422 bgcolor=#d6d6d6
| 604422 ||  || — || March 18, 2009 || Bergisch Gladbach || W. Bickel ||  || align=right | 2.2 km || 
|-id=423 bgcolor=#E9E9E9
| 604423 ||  || — || January 17, 2009 || Kitt Peak || Spacewatch ||  || align=right | 1.7 km || 
|-id=424 bgcolor=#d6d6d6
| 604424 ||  || — || December 19, 2012 || Calar Alto-CASADO || S. Mottola ||  || align=right | 1.9 km || 
|-id=425 bgcolor=#fefefe
| 604425 ||  || — || May 26, 2007 || Mount Lemmon || Mount Lemmon Survey ||  || align=right data-sort-value="0.72" | 720 m || 
|-id=426 bgcolor=#fefefe
| 604426 ||  || — || October 10, 2008 || Kitt Peak || Spacewatch ||  || align=right data-sort-value="0.60" | 600 m || 
|-id=427 bgcolor=#d6d6d6
| 604427 ||  || — || August 27, 2005 || Kitt Peak || Spacewatch ||  || align=right | 2.1 km || 
|-id=428 bgcolor=#d6d6d6
| 604428 ||  || — || March 8, 2013 || Haleakala || Pan-STARRS ||  || align=right | 1.9 km || 
|-id=429 bgcolor=#d6d6d6
| 604429 ||  || — || June 12, 2007 || Mauna Kea || Mauna Kea Obs. || 3:2 || align=right | 3.5 km || 
|-id=430 bgcolor=#d6d6d6
| 604430 ||  || — || April 9, 2003 || Kitt Peak || Spacewatch ||  || align=right | 2.4 km || 
|-id=431 bgcolor=#d6d6d6
| 604431 ||  || — || July 24, 2015 || Haleakala || Pan-STARRS ||  || align=right | 2.3 km || 
|-id=432 bgcolor=#d6d6d6
| 604432 ||  || — || October 1, 2000 || Apache Point || SDSS Collaboration ||  || align=right | 2.9 km || 
|-id=433 bgcolor=#d6d6d6
| 604433 ||  || — || October 25, 2005 || Kitt Peak || Spacewatch ||  || align=right | 2.4 km || 
|-id=434 bgcolor=#d6d6d6
| 604434 ||  || — || October 31, 2010 || Mount Lemmon || Mount Lemmon Survey ||  || align=right | 2.2 km || 
|-id=435 bgcolor=#d6d6d6
| 604435 ||  || — || March 23, 2003 || Apache Point || SDSS Collaboration ||  || align=right | 2.1 km || 
|-id=436 bgcolor=#d6d6d6
| 604436 ||  || — || May 20, 2014 || Haleakala || Pan-STARRS || EOS || align=right | 1.5 km || 
|-id=437 bgcolor=#d6d6d6
| 604437 ||  || — || December 27, 2011 || Mount Lemmon || Mount Lemmon Survey ||  || align=right | 2.3 km || 
|-id=438 bgcolor=#d6d6d6
| 604438 ||  || — || April 25, 2003 || Kitt Peak || Spacewatch ||  || align=right | 2.4 km || 
|-id=439 bgcolor=#d6d6d6
| 604439 ||  || — || May 4, 2014 || Haleakala || Pan-STARRS ||  || align=right | 2.0 km || 
|-id=440 bgcolor=#d6d6d6
| 604440 ||  || — || September 7, 2004 || Kitt Peak || Spacewatch || (8737) || align=right | 2.1 km || 
|-id=441 bgcolor=#E9E9E9
| 604441 ||  || — || May 10, 2014 || Haleakala || Pan-STARRS ||  || align=right | 1.9 km || 
|-id=442 bgcolor=#d6d6d6
| 604442 ||  || — || February 7, 2008 || Mount Lemmon || Mount Lemmon Survey || Tj (2.96) || align=right | 2.5 km || 
|-id=443 bgcolor=#fefefe
| 604443 ||  || — || September 2, 2010 || Mount Lemmon || Mount Lemmon Survey || H || align=right data-sort-value="0.32" | 320 m || 
|-id=444 bgcolor=#E9E9E9
| 604444 ||  || — || August 9, 2015 || Haleakala || Pan-STARRS 2 ||  || align=right | 1.7 km || 
|-id=445 bgcolor=#E9E9E9
| 604445 ||  || — || October 20, 2007 || Mount Lemmon || Mount Lemmon Survey ||  || align=right | 1.2 km || 
|-id=446 bgcolor=#d6d6d6
| 604446 ||  || — || January 2, 2012 || Mount Lemmon || Mount Lemmon Survey ||  || align=right | 2.2 km || 
|-id=447 bgcolor=#d6d6d6
| 604447 ||  || — || October 13, 2010 || Mount Lemmon || Mount Lemmon Survey ||  || align=right | 2.3 km || 
|-id=448 bgcolor=#d6d6d6
| 604448 ||  || — || March 29, 2012 || Haleakala || Pan-STARRS ||  || align=right | 2.5 km || 
|-id=449 bgcolor=#d6d6d6
| 604449 ||  || — || August 9, 2015 || Haleakala || Pan-STARRS ||  || align=right | 1.8 km || 
|-id=450 bgcolor=#d6d6d6
| 604450 ||  || — || August 12, 2015 || Haleakala || Pan-STARRS ||  || align=right | 2.3 km || 
|-id=451 bgcolor=#d6d6d6
| 604451 ||  || — || August 9, 2015 || Haleakala || Pan-STARRS ||  || align=right | 1.6 km || 
|-id=452 bgcolor=#E9E9E9
| 604452 ||  || — || August 12, 2015 || Haleakala || Pan-STARRS ||  || align=right | 1.6 km || 
|-id=453 bgcolor=#E9E9E9
| 604453 ||  || — || May 7, 2014 || Haleakala || Pan-STARRS ||  || align=right | 1.6 km || 
|-id=454 bgcolor=#d6d6d6
| 604454 ||  || — || August 12, 2015 || Haleakala || Pan-STARRS ||  || align=right | 2.0 km || 
|-id=455 bgcolor=#E9E9E9
| 604455 ||  || — || June 21, 2015 || Haleakala || Pan-STARRS 2 ||  || align=right | 1.2 km || 
|-id=456 bgcolor=#FA8072
| 604456 ||  || — || May 30, 2015 || Haleakala || Pan-STARRS ||  || align=right data-sort-value="0.87" | 870 m || 
|-id=457 bgcolor=#d6d6d6
| 604457 ||  || — || April 30, 2014 || Haleakala || Pan-STARRS ||  || align=right | 2.1 km || 
|-id=458 bgcolor=#d6d6d6
| 604458 ||  || — || February 23, 2012 || Mount Lemmon || Mount Lemmon Survey ||  || align=right | 2.8 km || 
|-id=459 bgcolor=#E9E9E9
| 604459 ||  || — || December 1, 2011 || Haleakala || Pan-STARRS ||  || align=right | 1.9 km || 
|-id=460 bgcolor=#E9E9E9
| 604460 ||  || — || March 8, 2005 || Mount Lemmon || Mount Lemmon Survey ||  || align=right | 1.3 km || 
|-id=461 bgcolor=#d6d6d6
| 604461 ||  || — || August 21, 2015 || Haleakala || Pan-STARRS ||  || align=right | 2.6 km || 
|-id=462 bgcolor=#d6d6d6
| 604462 ||  || — || November 17, 2004 || Campo Imperatore || CINEOS ||  || align=right | 3.0 km || 
|-id=463 bgcolor=#d6d6d6
| 604463 ||  || — || February 7, 2007 || Mount Lemmon || Mount Lemmon Survey ||  || align=right | 2.4 km || 
|-id=464 bgcolor=#d6d6d6
| 604464 ||  || — || October 9, 2010 || Mount Lemmon || Mount Lemmon Survey ||  || align=right | 2.2 km || 
|-id=465 bgcolor=#d6d6d6
| 604465 ||  || — || August 1, 2009 || Kitt Peak || Spacewatch ||  || align=right | 2.3 km || 
|-id=466 bgcolor=#d6d6d6
| 604466 ||  || — || November 5, 2010 || Kitt Peak || Spacewatch ||  || align=right | 2.7 km || 
|-id=467 bgcolor=#d6d6d6
| 604467 ||  || — || October 7, 2010 || Mount Lemmon || Mount Lemmon Survey ||  || align=right | 2.9 km || 
|-id=468 bgcolor=#d6d6d6
| 604468 ||  || — || August 19, 2015 || La Palma || A. Ferragamo, O. Vaduvescu ||  || align=right | 2.0 km || 
|-id=469 bgcolor=#d6d6d6
| 604469 ||  || — || May 28, 2014 || Haleakala || Pan-STARRS ||  || align=right | 1.9 km || 
|-id=470 bgcolor=#d6d6d6
| 604470 ||  || — || July 1, 2014 || Haleakala || Pan-STARRS ||  || align=right | 2.2 km || 
|-id=471 bgcolor=#d6d6d6
| 604471 ||  || — || August 13, 2004 || Cerro Tololo || Cerro Tololo Obs. ||  || align=right | 2.4 km || 
|-id=472 bgcolor=#d6d6d6
| 604472 ||  || — || August 21, 2015 || Haleakala || Pan-STARRS ||  || align=right | 1.8 km || 
|-id=473 bgcolor=#d6d6d6
| 604473 ||  || — || August 21, 2015 || Haleakala || Pan-STARRS ||  || align=right | 2.0 km || 
|-id=474 bgcolor=#E9E9E9
| 604474 ||  || — || September 28, 2011 || Les Engarouines || L. Bernasconi ||  || align=right | 1.5 km || 
|-id=475 bgcolor=#E9E9E9
| 604475 ||  || — || October 19, 2006 || Mount Lemmon || Mount Lemmon Survey ||  || align=right | 2.4 km || 
|-id=476 bgcolor=#d6d6d6
| 604476 ||  || — || October 16, 2010 || Mayhill-ISON || L. Elenin ||  || align=right | 2.1 km || 
|-id=477 bgcolor=#d6d6d6
| 604477 ||  || — || February 28, 2009 || Kitt Peak || Spacewatch ||  || align=right | 1.9 km || 
|-id=478 bgcolor=#fefefe
| 604478 ||  || — || February 12, 2004 || Kitt Peak || Spacewatch || H || align=right data-sort-value="0.45" | 450 m || 
|-id=479 bgcolor=#d6d6d6
| 604479 ||  || — || February 28, 2014 || Haleakala || Pan-STARRS ||  || align=right | 2.2 km || 
|-id=480 bgcolor=#E9E9E9
| 604480 ||  || — || November 3, 2011 || Mount Lemmon || Mount Lemmon Survey ||  || align=right | 2.9 km || 
|-id=481 bgcolor=#E9E9E9
| 604481 ||  || — || February 3, 2013 || Haleakala || Pan-STARRS ||  || align=right | 2.3 km || 
|-id=482 bgcolor=#d6d6d6
| 604482 ||  || — || September 11, 2001 || Kitt Peak || Spacewatch ||  || align=right | 1.8 km || 
|-id=483 bgcolor=#d6d6d6
| 604483 ||  || — || July 23, 2015 || Haleakala || Pan-STARRS ||  || align=right | 2.1 km || 
|-id=484 bgcolor=#d6d6d6
| 604484 ||  || — || August 13, 2015 || XuYi || PMO NEO ||  || align=right | 2.8 km || 
|-id=485 bgcolor=#d6d6d6
| 604485 ||  || — || October 5, 2005 || Catalina || CSS ||  || align=right | 3.1 km || 
|-id=486 bgcolor=#d6d6d6
| 604486 ||  || — || January 28, 2007 || Mount Lemmon || Mount Lemmon Survey ||  || align=right | 2.4 km || 
|-id=487 bgcolor=#E9E9E9
| 604487 ||  || — || January 17, 2013 || Haleakala || Pan-STARRS ||  || align=right | 1.2 km || 
|-id=488 bgcolor=#fefefe
| 604488 ||  || — || February 18, 2014 || Mount Lemmon || Mount Lemmon Survey || H || align=right data-sort-value="0.59" | 590 m || 
|-id=489 bgcolor=#E9E9E9
| 604489 ||  || — || September 9, 2015 || Haleakala || Pan-STARRS ||  || align=right | 1.6 km || 
|-id=490 bgcolor=#d6d6d6
| 604490 ||  || — || September 9, 2015 || Haleakala || Pan-STARRS ||  || align=right | 2.9 km || 
|-id=491 bgcolor=#d6d6d6
| 604491 ||  || — || January 30, 2011 || Mount Lemmon || Mount Lemmon Survey || Tj (2.98) || align=right | 2.7 km || 
|-id=492 bgcolor=#d6d6d6
| 604492 ||  || — || November 1, 2010 || Mount Lemmon || Mount Lemmon Survey ||  || align=right | 2.3 km || 
|-id=493 bgcolor=#d6d6d6
| 604493 ||  || — || September 15, 2004 || Kitt Peak || Spacewatch ||  || align=right | 2.0 km || 
|-id=494 bgcolor=#d6d6d6
| 604494 ||  || — || February 12, 2008 || Mount Lemmon || Mount Lemmon Survey ||  || align=right | 2.8 km || 
|-id=495 bgcolor=#E9E9E9
| 604495 ||  || — || August 27, 2006 || Kitt Peak || Spacewatch ||  || align=right data-sort-value="0.92" | 920 m || 
|-id=496 bgcolor=#d6d6d6
| 604496 ||  || — || September 15, 1998 || Kitt Peak || Spacewatch ||  || align=right | 3.0 km || 
|-id=497 bgcolor=#d6d6d6
| 604497 ||  || — || September 18, 2010 || Mount Lemmon || Mount Lemmon Survey ||  || align=right | 2.4 km || 
|-id=498 bgcolor=#d6d6d6
| 604498 ||  || — || September 17, 2010 || Mount Lemmon || Mount Lemmon Survey ||  || align=right | 2.4 km || 
|-id=499 bgcolor=#d6d6d6
| 604499 ||  || — || March 19, 2013 || Haleakala || Pan-STARRS ||  || align=right | 2.9 km || 
|-id=500 bgcolor=#d6d6d6
| 604500 ||  || — || September 10, 2015 || Haleakala || Pan-STARRS ||  || align=right | 2.0 km || 
|}

604501–604600 

|-bgcolor=#d6d6d6
| 604501 ||  || — || April 6, 2013 || Mount Lemmon || Mount Lemmon Survey ||  || align=right | 2.3 km || 
|-id=502 bgcolor=#d6d6d6
| 604502 ||  || — || November 11, 2010 || Mount Lemmon || Mount Lemmon Survey ||  || align=right | 1.9 km || 
|-id=503 bgcolor=#E9E9E9
| 604503 ||  || — || October 24, 2011 || Kitt Peak || Spacewatch ||  || align=right | 1.1 km || 
|-id=504 bgcolor=#d6d6d6
| 604504 ||  || — || May 7, 2014 || Haleakala || Pan-STARRS ||  || align=right | 2.1 km || 
|-id=505 bgcolor=#E9E9E9
| 604505 ||  || — || August 9, 2015 || Haleakala || Pan-STARRS ||  || align=right | 1.3 km || 
|-id=506 bgcolor=#d6d6d6
| 604506 ||  || — || July 23, 2015 || Haleakala || Pan-STARRS ||  || align=right | 2.1 km || 
|-id=507 bgcolor=#d6d6d6
| 604507 ||  || — || October 7, 2004 || Kitt Peak || Spacewatch ||  || align=right | 2.5 km || 
|-id=508 bgcolor=#d6d6d6
| 604508 ||  || — || May 7, 2014 || Haleakala || Pan-STARRS ||  || align=right | 1.6 km || 
|-id=509 bgcolor=#d6d6d6
| 604509 ||  || — || September 15, 2004 || Kitt Peak || Spacewatch ||  || align=right | 2.8 km || 
|-id=510 bgcolor=#d6d6d6
| 604510 ||  || — || September 10, 2015 || Haleakala || Pan-STARRS ||  || align=right | 2.2 km || 
|-id=511 bgcolor=#d6d6d6
| 604511 ||  || — || September 9, 2004 || Kitt Peak || Spacewatch ||  || align=right | 2.4 km || 
|-id=512 bgcolor=#d6d6d6
| 604512 ||  || — || November 1, 2010 || Mount Lemmon || Mount Lemmon Survey ||  || align=right | 2.0 km || 
|-id=513 bgcolor=#d6d6d6
| 604513 ||  || — || September 11, 2004 || Kitt Peak || Spacewatch ||  || align=right | 2.2 km || 
|-id=514 bgcolor=#d6d6d6
| 604514 ||  || — || August 30, 2005 || Palomar || NEAT ||  || align=right | 2.5 km || 
|-id=515 bgcolor=#fefefe
| 604515 ||  || — || June 1, 2003 || Kitt Peak || Spacewatch ||  || align=right data-sort-value="0.83" | 830 m || 
|-id=516 bgcolor=#d6d6d6
| 604516 ||  || — || June 24, 2015 || Haleakala || Pan-STARRS ||  || align=right | 3.3 km || 
|-id=517 bgcolor=#d6d6d6
| 604517 ||  || — || April 11, 2008 || Mount Lemmon || Mount Lemmon Survey ||  || align=right | 3.0 km || 
|-id=518 bgcolor=#d6d6d6
| 604518 ||  || — || November 6, 2010 || Mount Lemmon || Mount Lemmon Survey ||  || align=right | 2.5 km || 
|-id=519 bgcolor=#E9E9E9
| 604519 ||  || — || September 20, 2015 || Catalina || CSS ||  || align=right | 1.3 km || 
|-id=520 bgcolor=#d6d6d6
| 604520 ||  || — || October 14, 2010 || Mount Lemmon || Mount Lemmon Survey ||  || align=right | 2.6 km || 
|-id=521 bgcolor=#d6d6d6
| 604521 ||  || — || September 8, 2004 || Palomar || NEAT ||  || align=right | 3.3 km || 
|-id=522 bgcolor=#E9E9E9
| 604522 ||  || — || January 1, 2009 || Mount Lemmon || Mount Lemmon Survey ||  || align=right | 1.4 km || 
|-id=523 bgcolor=#d6d6d6
| 604523 ||  || — || July 25, 2015 || Haleakala || Pan-STARRS ||  || align=right | 2.8 km || 
|-id=524 bgcolor=#FA8072
| 604524 ||  || — || February 3, 2009 || Kitt Peak || Spacewatch || H || align=right data-sort-value="0.65" | 650 m || 
|-id=525 bgcolor=#E9E9E9
| 604525 ||  || — || August 30, 2011 || Haleakala || Pan-STARRS ||  || align=right data-sort-value="0.89" | 890 m || 
|-id=526 bgcolor=#E9E9E9
| 604526 ||  || — || October 13, 2001 || Kitt Peak || Spacewatch ||  || align=right | 1.8 km || 
|-id=527 bgcolor=#d6d6d6
| 604527 ||  || — || July 28, 2005 || Palomar || NEAT ||  || align=right | 2.5 km || 
|-id=528 bgcolor=#d6d6d6
| 604528 ||  || — || January 24, 2007 || Mount Lemmon || Mount Lemmon Survey || EOS || align=right | 1.8 km || 
|-id=529 bgcolor=#fefefe
| 604529 ||  || — || August 9, 2015 || Haleakala || Pan-STARRS || H || align=right data-sort-value="0.48" | 480 m || 
|-id=530 bgcolor=#d6d6d6
| 604530 ||  || — || July 23, 2015 || Haleakala || Pan-STARRS ||  || align=right | 2.4 km || 
|-id=531 bgcolor=#E9E9E9
| 604531 ||  || — || September 9, 2015 || Haleakala || Pan-STARRS ||  || align=right | 1.1 km || 
|-id=532 bgcolor=#d6d6d6
| 604532 ||  || — || May 7, 2014 || Haleakala || Pan-STARRS ||  || align=right | 2.5 km || 
|-id=533 bgcolor=#d6d6d6
| 604533 ||  || — || October 15, 2004 || Mount Lemmon || Mount Lemmon Survey ||  || align=right | 3.0 km || 
|-id=534 bgcolor=#d6d6d6
| 604534 ||  || — || March 13, 2013 || Mount Lemmon || Mount Lemmon Survey ||  || align=right | 2.0 km || 
|-id=535 bgcolor=#d6d6d6
| 604535 ||  || — || September 9, 2015 || Haleakala || Pan-STARRS ||  || align=right | 2.0 km || 
|-id=536 bgcolor=#d6d6d6
| 604536 ||  || — || September 10, 2004 || Kitt Peak || Spacewatch ||  || align=right | 1.9 km || 
|-id=537 bgcolor=#d6d6d6
| 604537 ||  || — || June 22, 2014 || Mount Lemmon || Mount Lemmon Survey ||  || align=right | 2.0 km || 
|-id=538 bgcolor=#d6d6d6
| 604538 ||  || — || December 7, 2005 || Kitt Peak || Spacewatch ||  || align=right | 2.4 km || 
|-id=539 bgcolor=#d6d6d6
| 604539 ||  || — || August 22, 2004 || Kitt Peak || Spacewatch ||  || align=right | 2.4 km || 
|-id=540 bgcolor=#d6d6d6
| 604540 ||  || — || February 28, 2008 || Kitt Peak || Spacewatch ||  || align=right | 2.0 km || 
|-id=541 bgcolor=#d6d6d6
| 604541 ||  || — || September 11, 2004 || Kitt Peak || Spacewatch ||  || align=right | 2.6 km || 
|-id=542 bgcolor=#d6d6d6
| 604542 ||  || — || October 28, 2010 || Mount Lemmon || Mount Lemmon Survey ||  || align=right | 2.0 km || 
|-id=543 bgcolor=#d6d6d6
| 604543 ||  || — || September 19, 2010 || Kitt Peak || Spacewatch ||  || align=right | 1.9 km || 
|-id=544 bgcolor=#d6d6d6
| 604544 ||  || — || October 17, 2010 || Mount Lemmon || Mount Lemmon Survey ||  || align=right | 2.1 km || 
|-id=545 bgcolor=#d6d6d6
| 604545 ||  || — || September 4, 2010 || Kitt Peak || Spacewatch ||  || align=right | 1.7 km || 
|-id=546 bgcolor=#d6d6d6
| 604546 ||  || — || August 21, 2015 || Haleakala || Pan-STARRS ||  || align=right | 2.1 km || 
|-id=547 bgcolor=#fefefe
| 604547 ||  || — || March 15, 2007 || Mount Lemmon || Mount Lemmon Survey ||  || align=right data-sort-value="0.56" | 560 m || 
|-id=548 bgcolor=#E9E9E9
| 604548 ||  || — || October 24, 2011 || Haleakala || Pan-STARRS ||  || align=right | 1.1 km || 
|-id=549 bgcolor=#d6d6d6
| 604549 ||  || — || March 26, 2007 || Mount Lemmon || Mount Lemmon Survey ||  || align=right | 1.9 km || 
|-id=550 bgcolor=#d6d6d6
| 604550 ||  || — || March 18, 2013 || Mount Lemmon || Mount Lemmon Survey ||  || align=right | 2.5 km || 
|-id=551 bgcolor=#d6d6d6
| 604551 ||  || — || May 5, 2002 || Kitt Peak || Spacewatch ||  || align=right | 2.1 km || 
|-id=552 bgcolor=#d6d6d6
| 604552 ||  || — || September 9, 2015 || Haleakala || Pan-STARRS ||  || align=right | 2.1 km || 
|-id=553 bgcolor=#d6d6d6
| 604553 ||  || — || September 17, 2010 || Mount Lemmon || Mount Lemmon Survey ||  || align=right | 2.2 km || 
|-id=554 bgcolor=#d6d6d6
| 604554 ||  || — || September 4, 2015 || Kitt Peak || Spacewatch ||  || align=right | 1.9 km || 
|-id=555 bgcolor=#E9E9E9
| 604555 ||  || — || October 15, 2007 || Kitt Peak || Spacewatch ||  || align=right data-sort-value="0.98" | 980 m || 
|-id=556 bgcolor=#d6d6d6
| 604556 ||  || — || October 9, 2010 || Mount Lemmon || Mount Lemmon Survey ||  || align=right | 2.4 km || 
|-id=557 bgcolor=#d6d6d6
| 604557 ||  || — || November 13, 2010 || Mount Lemmon || Mount Lemmon Survey ||  || align=right | 2.3 km || 
|-id=558 bgcolor=#E9E9E9
| 604558 ||  || — || September 11, 2015 || Haleakala || Pan-STARRS ||  || align=right | 1.1 km || 
|-id=559 bgcolor=#d6d6d6
| 604559 ||  || — || December 13, 2010 || Mount Lemmon || Mount Lemmon Survey || THM || align=right | 1.9 km || 
|-id=560 bgcolor=#d6d6d6
| 604560 ||  || — || November 12, 2010 || Mount Lemmon || Mount Lemmon Survey ||  || align=right | 2.0 km || 
|-id=561 bgcolor=#d6d6d6
| 604561 ||  || — || September 11, 2015 || Haleakala || Pan-STARRS ||  || align=right | 2.2 km || 
|-id=562 bgcolor=#d6d6d6
| 604562 ||  || — || September 11, 2015 || Haleakala || Pan-STARRS ||  || align=right | 2.1 km || 
|-id=563 bgcolor=#d6d6d6
| 604563 ||  || — || March 16, 2007 || Kitt Peak || Spacewatch ||  || align=right | 2.6 km || 
|-id=564 bgcolor=#E9E9E9
| 604564 ||  || — || March 30, 2003 || Kitt Peak || M. W. Buie, A. B. Jordan ||  || align=right | 1.6 km || 
|-id=565 bgcolor=#d6d6d6
| 604565 ||  || — || February 9, 2013 || Haleakala || Pan-STARRS ||  || align=right | 2.0 km || 
|-id=566 bgcolor=#d6d6d6
| 604566 ||  || — || April 5, 2014 || Haleakala || Pan-STARRS ||  || align=right | 1.7 km || 
|-id=567 bgcolor=#E9E9E9
| 604567 ||  || — || September 11, 2015 || Haleakala || Pan-STARRS ||  || align=right | 1.8 km || 
|-id=568 bgcolor=#d6d6d6
| 604568 ||  || — || April 9, 2003 || Palomar || NEAT ||  || align=right | 2.7 km || 
|-id=569 bgcolor=#d6d6d6
| 604569 ||  || — || February 21, 2007 || Kitt Peak || Spacewatch ||  || align=right | 2.8 km || 
|-id=570 bgcolor=#d6d6d6
| 604570 ||  || — || September 17, 2010 || Kitt Peak || Spacewatch ||  || align=right | 1.7 km || 
|-id=571 bgcolor=#d6d6d6
| 604571 ||  || — || September 11, 2015 || Haleakala || Pan-STARRS ||  || align=right | 2.5 km || 
|-id=572 bgcolor=#d6d6d6
| 604572 ||  || — || September 17, 2009 || Mount Lemmon || Mount Lemmon Survey ||  || align=right | 2.4 km || 
|-id=573 bgcolor=#d6d6d6
| 604573 ||  || — || March 14, 2007 || Mount Lemmon || Mount Lemmon Survey ||  || align=right | 3.0 km || 
|-id=574 bgcolor=#d6d6d6
| 604574 ||  || — || September 17, 2010 || Mount Lemmon || Mount Lemmon Survey || KOR || align=right | 1.1 km || 
|-id=575 bgcolor=#d6d6d6
| 604575 ||  || — || September 11, 2015 || Haleakala || Pan-STARRS ||  || align=right | 1.9 km || 
|-id=576 bgcolor=#d6d6d6
| 604576 ||  || — || September 11, 2015 || Haleakala || Pan-STARRS || VER || align=right | 1.9 km || 
|-id=577 bgcolor=#d6d6d6
| 604577 ||  || — || September 25, 1998 || Apache Point || SDSS Collaboration ||  || align=right | 1.9 km || 
|-id=578 bgcolor=#d6d6d6
| 604578 ||  || — || February 27, 2008 || Mount Lemmon || Mount Lemmon Survey ||  || align=right | 2.1 km || 
|-id=579 bgcolor=#d6d6d6
| 604579 ||  || — || September 19, 1998 || Apache Point || SDSS Collaboration || VER || align=right | 1.7 km || 
|-id=580 bgcolor=#d6d6d6
| 604580 ||  || — || January 22, 2012 || Haleakala || Pan-STARRS ||  || align=right | 2.3 km || 
|-id=581 bgcolor=#d6d6d6
| 604581 ||  || — || August 12, 2015 || Haleakala || Pan-STARRS ||  || align=right | 2.1 km || 
|-id=582 bgcolor=#d6d6d6
| 604582 ||  || — || August 27, 2009 || Kitt Peak || Spacewatch ||  || align=right | 2.1 km || 
|-id=583 bgcolor=#d6d6d6
| 604583 ||  || — || September 11, 2015 || Haleakala || Pan-STARRS ||  || align=right | 2.3 km || 
|-id=584 bgcolor=#d6d6d6
| 604584 ||  || — || July 25, 2014 || Haleakala || Pan-STARRS ||  || align=right | 1.9 km || 
|-id=585 bgcolor=#E9E9E9
| 604585 ||  || — || September 11, 2015 || Haleakala || Pan-STARRS ||  || align=right | 1.6 km || 
|-id=586 bgcolor=#d6d6d6
| 604586 ||  || — || September 11, 2015 || Haleakala || Pan-STARRS ||  || align=right | 2.0 km || 
|-id=587 bgcolor=#d6d6d6
| 604587 ||  || — || February 15, 2013 || Haleakala || Pan-STARRS ||  || align=right | 2.0 km || 
|-id=588 bgcolor=#d6d6d6
| 604588 ||  || — || August 17, 2009 || Kitt Peak || Spacewatch ||  || align=right | 2.0 km || 
|-id=589 bgcolor=#d6d6d6
| 604589 ||  || — || March 16, 2007 || Mount Lemmon || Mount Lemmon Survey ||  || align=right | 2.0 km || 
|-id=590 bgcolor=#E9E9E9
| 604590 ||  || — || September 11, 2015 || Haleakala || Pan-STARRS ||  || align=right | 1.7 km || 
|-id=591 bgcolor=#d6d6d6
| 604591 ||  || — || August 29, 2009 || Kitt Peak || Spacewatch ||  || align=right | 2.7 km || 
|-id=592 bgcolor=#d6d6d6
| 604592 ||  || — || September 12, 2015 || Haleakala || Pan-STARRS ||  || align=right | 2.5 km || 
|-id=593 bgcolor=#E9E9E9
| 604593 ||  || — || September 9, 2015 || Haleakala || Pan-STARRS ||  || align=right data-sort-value="0.81" | 810 m || 
|-id=594 bgcolor=#d6d6d6
| 604594 ||  || — || October 2, 2010 || Kitt Peak || Spacewatch ||  || align=right | 2.4 km || 
|-id=595 bgcolor=#d6d6d6
| 604595 ||  || — || May 28, 2014 || Haleakala || Pan-STARRS ||  || align=right | 1.5 km || 
|-id=596 bgcolor=#E9E9E9
| 604596 ||  || — || September 8, 2015 || Haleakala || Pan-STARRS ||  || align=right data-sort-value="0.82" | 820 m || 
|-id=597 bgcolor=#d6d6d6
| 604597 ||  || — || September 10, 2015 || Haleakala || Pan-STARRS ||  || align=right | 2.0 km || 
|-id=598 bgcolor=#d6d6d6
| 604598 ||  || — || September 11, 2015 || Haleakala || Pan-STARRS ||  || align=right | 2.2 km || 
|-id=599 bgcolor=#E9E9E9
| 604599 ||  || — || September 10, 2015 || Haleakala || Pan-STARRS ||  || align=right | 1.5 km || 
|-id=600 bgcolor=#d6d6d6
| 604600 ||  || — || October 16, 2009 || Mount Lemmon || Mount Lemmon Survey ||  || align=right | 2.3 km || 
|}

604601–604700 

|-bgcolor=#d6d6d6
| 604601 ||  || — || September 10, 2015 || Haleakala || Pan-STARRS ||  || align=right | 2.1 km || 
|-id=602 bgcolor=#d6d6d6
| 604602 ||  || — || September 8, 2015 || Haleakala || Pan-STARRS ||  || align=right | 2.0 km || 
|-id=603 bgcolor=#d6d6d6
| 604603 ||  || — || September 6, 2015 || Haleakala || Pan-STARRS ||  || align=right | 2.0 km || 
|-id=604 bgcolor=#E9E9E9
| 604604 ||  || — || September 12, 2015 || Haleakala || Pan-STARRS ||  || align=right | 1.5 km || 
|-id=605 bgcolor=#d6d6d6
| 604605 ||  || — || September 9, 2015 || Haleakala || Pan-STARRS ||  || align=right | 2.0 km || 
|-id=606 bgcolor=#d6d6d6
| 604606 ||  || — || September 9, 2015 || Haleakala || Pan-STARRS ||  || align=right | 1.9 km || 
|-id=607 bgcolor=#d6d6d6
| 604607 ||  || — || May 9, 2013 || Haleakala || Pan-STARRS ||  || align=right | 2.4 km || 
|-id=608 bgcolor=#d6d6d6
| 604608 ||  || — || October 3, 2015 || Mount Lemmon || Mount Lemmon Survey ||  || align=right | 2.2 km || 
|-id=609 bgcolor=#d6d6d6
| 604609 ||  || — || February 27, 2012 || La Palma || La Palma Obs. ||  || align=right | 2.2 km || 
|-id=610 bgcolor=#d6d6d6
| 604610 ||  || — || March 8, 2013 || Haleakala || Pan-STARRS ||  || align=right | 3.0 km || 
|-id=611 bgcolor=#fefefe
| 604611 ||  || — || January 10, 2014 || Catalina || CSS || H || align=right data-sort-value="0.66" | 660 m || 
|-id=612 bgcolor=#fefefe
| 604612 ||  || — || December 9, 2010 || Mount Lemmon || Mount Lemmon Survey || H || align=right data-sort-value="0.47" | 470 m || 
|-id=613 bgcolor=#d6d6d6
| 604613 ||  || — || May 7, 2014 || Haleakala || Pan-STARRS ||  || align=right | 3.5 km || 
|-id=614 bgcolor=#d6d6d6
| 604614 ||  || — || July 23, 2015 || Haleakala || Pan-STARRS ||  || align=right | 2.4 km || 
|-id=615 bgcolor=#d6d6d6
| 604615 ||  || — || March 10, 2008 || Mount Lemmon || Mount Lemmon Survey ||  || align=right | 2.2 km || 
|-id=616 bgcolor=#d6d6d6
| 604616 ||  || — || October 3, 2010 || Kitt Peak || Spacewatch ||  || align=right | 2.5 km || 
|-id=617 bgcolor=#d6d6d6
| 604617 ||  || — || November 2, 2010 || Mount Lemmon || Mount Lemmon Survey ||  || align=right | 2.2 km || 
|-id=618 bgcolor=#d6d6d6
| 604618 ||  || — || January 4, 2012 || Mount Lemmon || Mount Lemmon Survey ||  || align=right | 2.5 km || 
|-id=619 bgcolor=#d6d6d6
| 604619 ||  || — || September 3, 2010 || Mount Lemmon || Mount Lemmon Survey ||  || align=right | 3.2 km || 
|-id=620 bgcolor=#d6d6d6
| 604620 ||  || — || December 5, 2010 || Kitt Peak || Spacewatch ||  || align=right | 2.9 km || 
|-id=621 bgcolor=#E9E9E9
| 604621 ||  || — || September 24, 2015 || Mount Lemmon || Mount Lemmon Survey ||  || align=right | 2.0 km || 
|-id=622 bgcolor=#E9E9E9
| 604622 ||  || — || February 12, 2008 || Mount Lemmon || Mount Lemmon Survey ||  || align=right | 1.4 km || 
|-id=623 bgcolor=#d6d6d6
| 604623 ||  || — || June 26, 2015 || Haleakala || Pan-STARRS ||  || align=right | 2.7 km || 
|-id=624 bgcolor=#d6d6d6
| 604624 ||  || — || February 1, 2006 || Mount Lemmon || Mount Lemmon Survey ||  || align=right | 3.6 km || 
|-id=625 bgcolor=#d6d6d6
| 604625 ||  || — || August 28, 2009 || La Sagra || OAM Obs. ||  || align=right | 2.6 km || 
|-id=626 bgcolor=#d6d6d6
| 604626 ||  || — || January 30, 2011 || Mount Lemmon || Mount Lemmon Survey ||  || align=right | 2.3 km || 
|-id=627 bgcolor=#d6d6d6
| 604627 ||  || — || February 15, 2012 || Haleakala || Pan-STARRS ||  || align=right | 2.2 km || 
|-id=628 bgcolor=#E9E9E9
| 604628 ||  || — || October 18, 2011 || Mount Lemmon || Mount Lemmon Survey ||  || align=right | 1.3 km || 
|-id=629 bgcolor=#d6d6d6
| 604629 ||  || — || October 15, 2009 || La Sagra || OAM Obs. ||  || align=right | 2.2 km || 
|-id=630 bgcolor=#d6d6d6
| 604630 ||  || — || August 23, 2014 || Haleakala || Pan-STARRS ||  || align=right | 3.1 km || 
|-id=631 bgcolor=#d6d6d6
| 604631 ||  || — || September 23, 2015 || Mount Lemmon || Mount Lemmon Survey ||  || align=right | 2.0 km || 
|-id=632 bgcolor=#fefefe
| 604632 ||  || — || August 26, 2002 || Palomar || NEAT || H || align=right data-sort-value="0.45" | 450 m || 
|-id=633 bgcolor=#d6d6d6
| 604633 ||  || — || October 1, 2015 || Mount Lemmon || Mount Lemmon Survey ||  || align=right | 2.0 km || 
|-id=634 bgcolor=#d6d6d6
| 604634 ||  || — || July 25, 2015 || Haleakala || Pan-STARRS ||  || align=right | 2.1 km || 
|-id=635 bgcolor=#E9E9E9
| 604635 ||  || — || October 18, 2007 || Kitt Peak || Spacewatch ||  || align=right | 1.4 km || 
|-id=636 bgcolor=#E9E9E9
| 604636 ||  || — || September 14, 2007 || Catalina || CSS ||  || align=right data-sort-value="0.73" | 730 m || 
|-id=637 bgcolor=#E9E9E9
| 604637 ||  || — || August 29, 2006 || Catalina || CSS ||  || align=right | 2.5 km || 
|-id=638 bgcolor=#E9E9E9
| 604638 ||  || — || August 14, 2015 || Haleakala || Pan-STARRS ||  || align=right | 1.0 km || 
|-id=639 bgcolor=#d6d6d6
| 604639 ||  || — || September 12, 2015 || Haleakala || Pan-STARRS ||  || align=right | 2.4 km || 
|-id=640 bgcolor=#E9E9E9
| 604640 ||  || — || July 28, 2015 || Haleakala || Pan-STARRS ||  || align=right | 1.3 km || 
|-id=641 bgcolor=#d6d6d6
| 604641 ||  || — || July 25, 2015 || Haleakala || Pan-STARRS ||  || align=right | 2.4 km || 
|-id=642 bgcolor=#d6d6d6
| 604642 ||  || — || October 2, 2015 || Haleakala || Pan-STARRS ||  || align=right | 2.4 km || 
|-id=643 bgcolor=#d6d6d6
| 604643 ||  || — || December 3, 2010 || Mount Lemmon || Mount Lemmon Survey ||  || align=right | 2.9 km || 
|-id=644 bgcolor=#d6d6d6
| 604644 ||  || — || November 7, 2010 || Catalina || CSS ||  || align=right | 3.2 km || 
|-id=645 bgcolor=#d6d6d6
| 604645 ||  || — || October 9, 2010 || Mount Lemmon || Mount Lemmon Survey ||  || align=right | 3.1 km || 
|-id=646 bgcolor=#d6d6d6
| 604646 ||  || — || November 13, 2010 || Mount Lemmon || Mount Lemmon Survey ||  || align=right | 2.3 km || 
|-id=647 bgcolor=#d6d6d6
| 604647 ||  || — || September 2, 2010 || La Sagra || OAM Obs. ||  || align=right | 2.9 km || 
|-id=648 bgcolor=#d6d6d6
| 604648 ||  || — || October 6, 2015 || Oukaimeden || C. Rinner ||  || align=right | 2.9 km || 
|-id=649 bgcolor=#d6d6d6
| 604649 ||  || — || October 9, 1999 || Catalina || CSS ||  || align=right | 2.5 km || 
|-id=650 bgcolor=#E9E9E9
| 604650 ||  || — || September 24, 2011 || Haleakala || Pan-STARRS ||  || align=right | 1.5 km || 
|-id=651 bgcolor=#d6d6d6
| 604651 ||  || — || September 5, 2010 || Mount Lemmon || Mount Lemmon Survey ||  || align=right | 2.4 km || 
|-id=652 bgcolor=#E9E9E9
| 604652 ||  || — || March 31, 2014 || Kitt Peak || Spacewatch ||  || align=right | 1.8 km || 
|-id=653 bgcolor=#d6d6d6
| 604653 ||  || — || September 6, 2015 || Haleakala || Pan-STARRS ||  || align=right | 2.8 km || 
|-id=654 bgcolor=#d6d6d6
| 604654 ||  || — || May 28, 2014 || Mount Lemmon || Mount Lemmon Survey ||  || align=right | 2.0 km || 
|-id=655 bgcolor=#d6d6d6
| 604655 ||  || — || May 28, 2014 || Mount Lemmon || Mount Lemmon Survey ||  || align=right | 2.1 km || 
|-id=656 bgcolor=#E9E9E9
| 604656 ||  || — || January 10, 2013 || Haleakala || Pan-STARRS ||  || align=right | 1.9 km || 
|-id=657 bgcolor=#d6d6d6
| 604657 ||  || — || June 24, 2014 || Mount Lemmon || Mount Lemmon Survey ||  || align=right | 2.2 km || 
|-id=658 bgcolor=#d6d6d6
| 604658 ||  || — || October 5, 2015 || Haleakala || Pan-STARRS ||  || align=right | 1.8 km || 
|-id=659 bgcolor=#d6d6d6
| 604659 ||  || — || March 14, 2007 || Mount Lemmon || Mount Lemmon Survey ||  || align=right | 2.9 km || 
|-id=660 bgcolor=#d6d6d6
| 604660 ||  || — || December 29, 2011 || Mount Lemmon || Mount Lemmon Survey ||  || align=right | 2.2 km || 
|-id=661 bgcolor=#E9E9E9
| 604661 ||  || — || May 7, 2014 || Haleakala || Pan-STARRS ||  || align=right | 1.2 km || 
|-id=662 bgcolor=#d6d6d6
| 604662 ||  || — || April 22, 2014 || Kitt Peak || Spacewatch ||  || align=right | 2.2 km || 
|-id=663 bgcolor=#d6d6d6
| 604663 ||  || — || March 10, 2008 || Mount Lemmon || Mount Lemmon Survey ||  || align=right | 2.4 km || 
|-id=664 bgcolor=#d6d6d6
| 604664 ||  || — || October 8, 2015 || Haleakala || Pan-STARRS ||  || align=right | 2.2 km || 
|-id=665 bgcolor=#E9E9E9
| 604665 ||  || — || October 2, 2006 || Mount Lemmon || Mount Lemmon Survey ||  || align=right | 1.8 km || 
|-id=666 bgcolor=#E9E9E9
| 604666 ||  || — || May 30, 2015 || Haleakala || Pan-STARRS ||  || align=right | 1.9 km || 
|-id=667 bgcolor=#fefefe
| 604667 ||  || — || October 6, 2008 || Mount Lemmon || Mount Lemmon Survey ||  || align=right data-sort-value="0.80" | 800 m || 
|-id=668 bgcolor=#d6d6d6
| 604668 ||  || — || October 17, 2010 || Mount Lemmon || Mount Lemmon Survey ||  || align=right | 2.8 km || 
|-id=669 bgcolor=#E9E9E9
| 604669 ||  || — || May 8, 2014 || Haleakala || Pan-STARRS ||  || align=right data-sort-value="0.95" | 950 m || 
|-id=670 bgcolor=#d6d6d6
| 604670 ||  || — || April 7, 2007 || Mount Lemmon || Mount Lemmon Survey ||  || align=right | 2.3 km || 
|-id=671 bgcolor=#d6d6d6
| 604671 ||  || — || January 30, 2012 || Mount Lemmon || Mount Lemmon Survey || Tj (2.99) || align=right | 2.3 km || 
|-id=672 bgcolor=#E9E9E9
| 604672 ||  || — || May 21, 2014 || Haleakala || Pan-STARRS ||  || align=right | 1.6 km || 
|-id=673 bgcolor=#E9E9E9
| 604673 ||  || — || January 17, 2013 || Mount Lemmon || Mount Lemmon Survey ||  || align=right | 1.3 km || 
|-id=674 bgcolor=#d6d6d6
| 604674 ||  || — || September 5, 2010 || Mount Lemmon || Mount Lemmon Survey ||  || align=right | 2.1 km || 
|-id=675 bgcolor=#d6d6d6
| 604675 ||  || — || January 26, 2012 || Haleakala || Pan-STARRS ||  || align=right | 2.4 km || 
|-id=676 bgcolor=#fefefe
| 604676 ||  || — || January 8, 2010 || Mount Lemmon || Mount Lemmon Survey ||  || align=right data-sort-value="0.56" | 560 m || 
|-id=677 bgcolor=#d6d6d6
| 604677 ||  || — || September 18, 2010 || Mount Lemmon || Mount Lemmon Survey ||  || align=right | 2.3 km || 
|-id=678 bgcolor=#d6d6d6
| 604678 ||  || — || November 2, 2010 || Mount Lemmon || Mount Lemmon Survey ||  || align=right | 2.1 km || 
|-id=679 bgcolor=#d6d6d6
| 604679 ||  || — || September 7, 2004 || Kitt Peak || Spacewatch ||  || align=right | 3.2 km || 
|-id=680 bgcolor=#d6d6d6
| 604680 ||  || — || October 8, 2015 || Haleakala || Pan-STARRS ||  || align=right | 2.5 km || 
|-id=681 bgcolor=#E9E9E9
| 604681 ||  || — || June 24, 2014 || Haleakala || Pan-STARRS ||  || align=right | 1.3 km || 
|-id=682 bgcolor=#E9E9E9
| 604682 ||  || — || November 17, 2006 || Mount Lemmon || Mount Lemmon Survey ||  || align=right | 2.6 km || 
|-id=683 bgcolor=#d6d6d6
| 604683 ||  || — || November 4, 2004 || Kitt Peak || Spacewatch ||  || align=right | 3.3 km || 
|-id=684 bgcolor=#d6d6d6
| 604684 ||  || — || March 19, 2007 || Mount Lemmon || Mount Lemmon Survey ||  || align=right | 3.4 km || 
|-id=685 bgcolor=#d6d6d6
| 604685 ||  || — || October 8, 2015 || Haleakala || Pan-STARRS ||  || align=right | 1.9 km || 
|-id=686 bgcolor=#d6d6d6
| 604686 ||  || — || September 9, 2015 || Haleakala || Pan-STARRS ||  || align=right | 1.7 km || 
|-id=687 bgcolor=#d6d6d6
| 604687 ||  || — || April 22, 2007 || Mount Lemmon || Mount Lemmon Survey ||  || align=right | 2.2 km || 
|-id=688 bgcolor=#d6d6d6
| 604688 ||  || — || October 8, 2015 || Mount Lemmon || Mount Lemmon Survey ||  || align=right | 2.7 km || 
|-id=689 bgcolor=#d6d6d6
| 604689 ||  || — || October 8, 2015 || Haleakala || Pan-STARRS || Tj (2.95) || align=right | 2.8 km || 
|-id=690 bgcolor=#d6d6d6
| 604690 ||  || — || October 8, 2015 || Haleakala || Pan-STARRS ||  || align=right | 3.1 km || 
|-id=691 bgcolor=#d6d6d6
| 604691 ||  || — || October 8, 2015 || Haleakala || Pan-STARRS ||  || align=right | 2.1 km || 
|-id=692 bgcolor=#d6d6d6
| 604692 ||  || — || September 11, 2015 || Haleakala || Pan-STARRS ||  || align=right | 2.5 km || 
|-id=693 bgcolor=#d6d6d6
| 604693 ||  || — || October 16, 2009 || Mount Lemmon || Mount Lemmon Survey ||  || align=right | 2.3 km || 
|-id=694 bgcolor=#d6d6d6
| 604694 ||  || — || September 30, 2003 || Kitt Peak || Spacewatch ||  || align=right | 2.2 km || 
|-id=695 bgcolor=#d6d6d6
| 604695 ||  || — || September 12, 2015 || Haleakala || Pan-STARRS ||  || align=right | 1.6 km || 
|-id=696 bgcolor=#E9E9E9
| 604696 ||  || — || December 18, 2007 || Mount Lemmon || Mount Lemmon Survey ||  || align=right data-sort-value="0.80" | 800 m || 
|-id=697 bgcolor=#d6d6d6
| 604697 ||  || — || May 23, 2014 || Haleakala || Pan-STARRS ||  || align=right | 1.8 km || 
|-id=698 bgcolor=#d6d6d6
| 604698 ||  || — || January 18, 2012 || Mount Lemmon || Mount Lemmon Survey ||  || align=right | 2.0 km || 
|-id=699 bgcolor=#d6d6d6
| 604699 ||  || — || September 11, 2015 || Haleakala || Pan-STARRS ||  || align=right | 2.4 km || 
|-id=700 bgcolor=#E9E9E9
| 604700 ||  || — || August 30, 2011 || Haleakala || Pan-STARRS ||  || align=right | 1.1 km || 
|}

604701–604800 

|-bgcolor=#d6d6d6
| 604701 ||  || — || June 29, 2015 || Haleakala || Pan-STARRS ||  || align=right | 1.8 km || 
|-id=702 bgcolor=#d6d6d6
| 604702 ||  || — || October 9, 2015 || Kitt Peak || Spacewatch ||  || align=right | 2.5 km || 
|-id=703 bgcolor=#E9E9E9
| 604703 ||  || — || September 13, 2006 || Palomar || NEAT ||  || align=right | 1.3 km || 
|-id=704 bgcolor=#d6d6d6
| 604704 ||  || — || September 9, 2015 || Haleakala || Pan-STARRS ||  || align=right | 2.7 km || 
|-id=705 bgcolor=#d6d6d6
| 604705 ||  || — || October 9, 2010 || Kitt Peak || Spacewatch ||  || align=right | 2.1 km || 
|-id=706 bgcolor=#E9E9E9
| 604706 ||  || — || May 4, 2014 || Haleakala || Pan-STARRS ||  || align=right | 1.4 km || 
|-id=707 bgcolor=#d6d6d6
| 604707 ||  || — || August 12, 2015 || Haleakala || Pan-STARRS ||  || align=right | 2.3 km || 
|-id=708 bgcolor=#d6d6d6
| 604708 ||  || — || October 9, 2015 || Haleakala || Pan-STARRS ||  || align=right | 2.0 km || 
|-id=709 bgcolor=#E9E9E9
| 604709 ||  || — || June 25, 2015 || Haleakala || Pan-STARRS ||  || align=right | 2.1 km || 
|-id=710 bgcolor=#E9E9E9
| 604710 ||  || — || September 28, 2006 || Catalina || CSS ||  || align=right | 1.9 km || 
|-id=711 bgcolor=#d6d6d6
| 604711 ||  || — || November 6, 2010 || Catalina || CSS ||  || align=right | 2.4 km || 
|-id=712 bgcolor=#d6d6d6
| 604712 ||  || — || September 11, 2010 || Mount Lemmon || Mount Lemmon Survey ||  || align=right | 1.9 km || 
|-id=713 bgcolor=#d6d6d6
| 604713 ||  || — || November 4, 2004 || Catalina || CSS ||  || align=right | 3.4 km || 
|-id=714 bgcolor=#d6d6d6
| 604714 ||  || — || May 31, 2009 || Cerro Burek || Alianza S4 Obs. ||  || align=right | 2.4 km || 
|-id=715 bgcolor=#d6d6d6
| 604715 ||  || — || September 28, 2005 || Palomar || NEAT ||  || align=right | 3.3 km || 
|-id=716 bgcolor=#E9E9E9
| 604716 ||  || — || May 2, 2014 || Mount Lemmon || Mount Lemmon Survey ||  || align=right | 2.0 km || 
|-id=717 bgcolor=#d6d6d6
| 604717 ||  || — || November 8, 2010 || Kitt Peak || Spacewatch ||  || align=right | 2.7 km || 
|-id=718 bgcolor=#fefefe
| 604718 ||  || — || October 10, 2002 || Palomar || NEAT || H || align=right data-sort-value="0.69" | 690 m || 
|-id=719 bgcolor=#d6d6d6
| 604719 ||  || — || October 19, 2009 || Mount Lemmon || Mount Lemmon Survey ||  || align=right | 2.7 km || 
|-id=720 bgcolor=#fefefe
| 604720 ||  || — || April 19, 2007 || Mount Lemmon || Mount Lemmon Survey ||  || align=right data-sort-value="0.74" | 740 m || 
|-id=721 bgcolor=#d6d6d6
| 604721 ||  || — || December 2, 2004 || Catalina || CSS ||  || align=right | 3.1 km || 
|-id=722 bgcolor=#d6d6d6
| 604722 ||  || — || September 14, 2010 || Mount Lemmon || Mount Lemmon Survey ||  || align=right | 3.1 km || 
|-id=723 bgcolor=#d6d6d6
| 604723 ||  || — || April 17, 2013 || Cerro Tololo-DECam || CTIO-DECam || VER || align=right | 2.0 km || 
|-id=724 bgcolor=#d6d6d6
| 604724 ||  || — || September 23, 2004 || Kitt Peak || Spacewatch ||  || align=right | 2.5 km || 
|-id=725 bgcolor=#E9E9E9
| 604725 ||  || — || September 11, 2006 || Catalina || CSS || EUN || align=right | 1.3 km || 
|-id=726 bgcolor=#fefefe
| 604726 ||  || — || August 23, 2004 || Kitt Peak || Spacewatch ||  || align=right data-sort-value="0.64" | 640 m || 
|-id=727 bgcolor=#E9E9E9
| 604727 ||  || — || September 17, 2006 || Kitt Peak || Spacewatch ||  || align=right | 1.7 km || 
|-id=728 bgcolor=#d6d6d6
| 604728 ||  || — || December 24, 2005 || Kitt Peak || Spacewatch ||  || align=right | 2.4 km || 
|-id=729 bgcolor=#d6d6d6
| 604729 ||  || — || April 7, 2013 || Mount Lemmon || Mount Lemmon Survey ||  || align=right | 2.1 km || 
|-id=730 bgcolor=#d6d6d6
| 604730 ||  || — || September 18, 2015 || Mount Lemmon || Mount Lemmon Survey ||  || align=right | 2.2 km || 
|-id=731 bgcolor=#d6d6d6
| 604731 ||  || — || April 6, 2013 || Mount Lemmon || Mount Lemmon Survey ||  || align=right | 2.3 km || 
|-id=732 bgcolor=#d6d6d6
| 604732 ||  || — || September 11, 2015 || Haleakala || Pan-STARRS ||  || align=right | 2.1 km || 
|-id=733 bgcolor=#E9E9E9
| 604733 ||  || — || August 25, 2001 || Kitt Peak || Spacewatch ||  || align=right | 2.0 km || 
|-id=734 bgcolor=#d6d6d6
| 604734 ||  || — || February 16, 2007 || Mount Lemmon || Mount Lemmon Survey ||  || align=right | 3.2 km || 
|-id=735 bgcolor=#d6d6d6
| 604735 ||  || — || April 25, 2007 || Mount Lemmon || Mount Lemmon Survey ||  || align=right | 3.2 km || 
|-id=736 bgcolor=#d6d6d6
| 604736 ||  || — || October 10, 2015 || Haleakala || Pan-STARRS ||  || align=right | 2.5 km || 
|-id=737 bgcolor=#d6d6d6
| 604737 ||  || — || July 1, 2014 || Mount Lemmon || Mount Lemmon Survey ||  || align=right | 1.8 km || 
|-id=738 bgcolor=#d6d6d6
| 604738 ||  || — || December 2, 2010 || Mount Lemmon || Mount Lemmon Survey ||  || align=right | 3.4 km || 
|-id=739 bgcolor=#d6d6d6
| 604739 ||  || — || February 24, 2012 || Kitt Peak || Spacewatch ||  || align=right | 3.1 km || 
|-id=740 bgcolor=#d6d6d6
| 604740 ||  || — || July 7, 2003 || Kitt Peak || Spacewatch ||  || align=right | 3.9 km || 
|-id=741 bgcolor=#FA8072
| 604741 ||  || — || October 13, 2004 || Socorro || LINEAR || Tj (2.92) || align=right | 2.0 km || 
|-id=742 bgcolor=#fefefe
| 604742 ||  || — || February 23, 2014 || Haleakala || Pan-STARRS || H || align=right data-sort-value="0.48" | 480 m || 
|-id=743 bgcolor=#d6d6d6
| 604743 ||  || — || September 7, 2004 || Palomar || NEAT ||  || align=right | 2.6 km || 
|-id=744 bgcolor=#d6d6d6
| 604744 ||  || — || February 17, 2013 || Mount Lemmon || Mount Lemmon Survey ||  || align=right | 3.2 km || 
|-id=745 bgcolor=#d6d6d6
| 604745 ||  || — || September 8, 2015 || XuYi || PMO NEO ||  || align=right | 2.3 km || 
|-id=746 bgcolor=#d6d6d6
| 604746 ||  || — || April 19, 2002 || Kitt Peak || Spacewatch || EOS || align=right | 2.1 km || 
|-id=747 bgcolor=#d6d6d6
| 604747 ||  || — || November 14, 2010 || Mount Lemmon || Mount Lemmon Survey ||  || align=right | 2.0 km || 
|-id=748 bgcolor=#d6d6d6
| 604748 ||  || — || August 25, 2003 || Cerro Tololo || Cerro Tololo Obs. ||  || align=right | 2.8 km || 
|-id=749 bgcolor=#d6d6d6
| 604749 ||  || — || August 27, 2009 || Catalina || CSS ||  || align=right | 3.1 km || 
|-id=750 bgcolor=#d6d6d6
| 604750 Marisabele ||  ||  || October 6, 2015 || Baldone || I. Eglītis ||  || align=right | 2.8 km || 
|-id=751 bgcolor=#d6d6d6
| 604751 ||  || — || October 11, 2010 || Mount Lemmon || Mount Lemmon Survey ||  || align=right | 2.6 km || 
|-id=752 bgcolor=#d6d6d6
| 604752 ||  || — || November 26, 2010 || Mount Lemmon || Mount Lemmon Survey ||  || align=right | 2.7 km || 
|-id=753 bgcolor=#d6d6d6
| 604753 ||  || — || October 17, 2010 || Mount Lemmon || Mount Lemmon Survey ||  || align=right | 2.0 km || 
|-id=754 bgcolor=#d6d6d6
| 604754 ||  || — || November 27, 2010 || Mount Lemmon || Mount Lemmon Survey ||  || align=right | 2.7 km || 
|-id=755 bgcolor=#d6d6d6
| 604755 ||  || — || February 21, 2007 || Mount Lemmon || Mount Lemmon Survey ||  || align=right | 2.7 km || 
|-id=756 bgcolor=#d6d6d6
| 604756 ||  || — || November 10, 2010 || Mount Lemmon || Mount Lemmon Survey ||  || align=right | 2.5 km || 
|-id=757 bgcolor=#d6d6d6
| 604757 ||  || — || March 17, 2013 || Mount Lemmon || Mount Lemmon Survey ||  || align=right | 2.3 km || 
|-id=758 bgcolor=#d6d6d6
| 604758 ||  || — || July 1, 2014 || Haleakala || Pan-STARRS ||  || align=right | 2.8 km || 
|-id=759 bgcolor=#E9E9E9
| 604759 ||  || — || February 3, 2009 || Mount Lemmon || Mount Lemmon Survey ||  || align=right | 1.3 km || 
|-id=760 bgcolor=#d6d6d6
| 604760 ||  || — || December 2, 2010 || Mount Lemmon || Mount Lemmon Survey ||  || align=right | 1.9 km || 
|-id=761 bgcolor=#d6d6d6
| 604761 ||  || — || September 12, 2015 || Haleakala || Pan-STARRS ||  || align=right | 2.3 km || 
|-id=762 bgcolor=#d6d6d6
| 604762 ||  || — || October 4, 2004 || Kitt Peak || Spacewatch ||  || align=right | 2.6 km || 
|-id=763 bgcolor=#d6d6d6
| 604763 ||  || — || February 20, 2006 || Kitt Peak || Spacewatch ||  || align=right | 2.3 km || 
|-id=764 bgcolor=#d6d6d6
| 604764 ||  || — || April 15, 2008 || Mount Lemmon || Mount Lemmon Survey ||  || align=right | 2.6 km || 
|-id=765 bgcolor=#E9E9E9
| 604765 ||  || — || May 4, 2014 || Mount Lemmon || Mount Lemmon Survey ||  || align=right | 1.6 km || 
|-id=766 bgcolor=#d6d6d6
| 604766 ||  || — || September 11, 2010 || Mount Lemmon || Mount Lemmon Survey ||  || align=right | 2.1 km || 
|-id=767 bgcolor=#d6d6d6
| 604767 ||  || — || September 11, 2004 || Socorro || LINEAR ||  || align=right | 2.7 km || 
|-id=768 bgcolor=#d6d6d6
| 604768 ||  || — || November 8, 2010 || Mount Lemmon || Mount Lemmon Survey ||  || align=right | 2.0 km || 
|-id=769 bgcolor=#d6d6d6
| 604769 ||  || — || October 12, 2015 || Space Surveillance || Space Surveillance Telescope ||  || align=right | 2.0 km || 
|-id=770 bgcolor=#d6d6d6
| 604770 ||  || — || April 6, 2008 || Kitt Peak || Spacewatch ||  || align=right | 2.4 km || 
|-id=771 bgcolor=#d6d6d6
| 604771 ||  || — || January 25, 2012 || Haleakala || Pan-STARRS ||  || align=right | 2.2 km || 
|-id=772 bgcolor=#d6d6d6
| 604772 ||  || — || February 26, 2012 || La Palma || La Palma Obs. ||  || align=right | 2.0 km || 
|-id=773 bgcolor=#d6d6d6
| 604773 ||  || — || September 6, 2015 || SATINO Remote || J. Jahn ||  || align=right | 2.8 km || 
|-id=774 bgcolor=#d6d6d6
| 604774 ||  || — || March 13, 2007 || Mount Lemmon || Mount Lemmon Survey ||  || align=right | 2.7 km || 
|-id=775 bgcolor=#d6d6d6
| 604775 ||  || — || May 24, 2014 || Haleakala || Pan-STARRS ||  || align=right | 2.3 km || 
|-id=776 bgcolor=#d6d6d6
| 604776 ||  || — || October 12, 2010 || Kitt Peak || Spacewatch ||  || align=right | 2.7 km || 
|-id=777 bgcolor=#E9E9E9
| 604777 ||  || — || January 13, 2008 || Kitt Peak || Spacewatch ||  || align=right | 3.0 km || 
|-id=778 bgcolor=#d6d6d6
| 604778 ||  || — || September 19, 2009 || Catalina || CSS ||  || align=right | 3.5 km || 
|-id=779 bgcolor=#d6d6d6
| 604779 ||  || — || October 12, 2015 || Haleakala || Pan-STARRS ||  || align=right | 1.9 km || 
|-id=780 bgcolor=#d6d6d6
| 604780 ||  || — || January 30, 2006 || Kitt Peak || Spacewatch ||  || align=right | 2.6 km || 
|-id=781 bgcolor=#d6d6d6
| 604781 ||  || — || January 9, 2006 || Kitt Peak || Spacewatch ||  || align=right | 2.4 km || 
|-id=782 bgcolor=#d6d6d6
| 604782 ||  || — || December 5, 2010 || Kitt Peak || Spacewatch ||  || align=right | 2.3 km || 
|-id=783 bgcolor=#E9E9E9
| 604783 ||  || — || May 3, 2014 || Kitt Peak || Spacewatch ||  || align=right | 1.4 km || 
|-id=784 bgcolor=#d6d6d6
| 604784 ||  || — || October 12, 2015 || Haleakala || Pan-STARRS ||  || align=right | 2.4 km || 
|-id=785 bgcolor=#d6d6d6
| 604785 ||  || — || November 5, 2010 || Mount Lemmon || Mount Lemmon Survey ||  || align=right | 3.4 km || 
|-id=786 bgcolor=#d6d6d6
| 604786 ||  || — || October 9, 2004 || Kitt Peak || Spacewatch || THM || align=right | 1.6 km || 
|-id=787 bgcolor=#E9E9E9
| 604787 ||  || — || September 14, 2002 || Anderson Mesa || LONEOS ||  || align=right | 1.5 km || 
|-id=788 bgcolor=#E9E9E9
| 604788 ||  || — || September 17, 2006 || Kitt Peak || Spacewatch ||  || align=right | 1.4 km || 
|-id=789 bgcolor=#d6d6d6
| 604789 ||  || — || September 12, 2015 || Haleakala || Pan-STARRS ||  || align=right | 2.0 km || 
|-id=790 bgcolor=#d6d6d6
| 604790 ||  || — || September 15, 2009 || Kitt Peak || Spacewatch || HYG || align=right | 2.2 km || 
|-id=791 bgcolor=#d6d6d6
| 604791 ||  || — || September 8, 2015 || XuYi || PMO NEO ||  || align=right | 3.3 km || 
|-id=792 bgcolor=#d6d6d6
| 604792 ||  || — || August 15, 2009 || Catalina || CSS ||  || align=right | 3.6 km || 
|-id=793 bgcolor=#d6d6d6
| 604793 ||  || — || September 17, 2009 || Catalina || CSS ||  || align=right | 3.1 km || 
|-id=794 bgcolor=#d6d6d6
| 604794 ||  || — || December 10, 2004 || Socorro || LINEAR ||  || align=right | 2.9 km || 
|-id=795 bgcolor=#d6d6d6
| 604795 ||  || — || February 14, 2012 || Haleakala || Pan-STARRS ||  || align=right | 2.1 km || 
|-id=796 bgcolor=#d6d6d6
| 604796 ||  || — || April 30, 2003 || Kitt Peak || Spacewatch ||  || align=right | 2.7 km || 
|-id=797 bgcolor=#d6d6d6
| 604797 ||  || — || January 26, 2012 || Mount Lemmon || Mount Lemmon Survey ||  || align=right | 2.4 km || 
|-id=798 bgcolor=#d6d6d6
| 604798 ||  || — || June 26, 2014 || Haleakala || Pan-STARRS ||  || align=right | 3.1 km || 
|-id=799 bgcolor=#d6d6d6
| 604799 ||  || — || September 29, 2010 || Mount Lemmon || Mount Lemmon Survey ||  || align=right | 1.6 km || 
|-id=800 bgcolor=#d6d6d6
| 604800 ||  || — || November 13, 2010 || Mount Lemmon || Mount Lemmon Survey ||  || align=right | 2.6 km || 
|}

604801–604900 

|-bgcolor=#d6d6d6
| 604801 ||  || — || October 15, 2015 || Haleakala || Pan-STARRS ||  || align=right | 2.3 km || 
|-id=802 bgcolor=#d6d6d6
| 604802 ||  || — || December 29, 2011 || Kitt Peak || Spacewatch ||  || align=right | 2.5 km || 
|-id=803 bgcolor=#d6d6d6
| 604803 ||  || — || October 12, 2015 || Haleakala || Pan-STARRS ||  || align=right | 2.1 km || 
|-id=804 bgcolor=#d6d6d6
| 604804 ||  || — || July 25, 2014 || Haleakala || Pan-STARRS ||  || align=right | 2.4 km || 
|-id=805 bgcolor=#d6d6d6
| 604805 ||  || — || March 19, 2001 || Apache Point || SDSS Collaboration ||  || align=right | 2.7 km || 
|-id=806 bgcolor=#fefefe
| 604806 ||  || — || March 9, 2003 || Palomar || NEAT || H || align=right data-sort-value="0.71" | 710 m || 
|-id=807 bgcolor=#d6d6d6
| 604807 ||  || — || September 19, 2009 || Kitt Peak || Spacewatch ||  || align=right | 2.1 km || 
|-id=808 bgcolor=#E9E9E9
| 604808 ||  || — || October 10, 2015 || Haleakala || Pan-STARRS ||  || align=right | 1.2 km || 
|-id=809 bgcolor=#d6d6d6
| 604809 ||  || — || May 15, 2008 || Mount Lemmon || Mount Lemmon Survey ||  || align=right | 2.9 km || 
|-id=810 bgcolor=#d6d6d6
| 604810 ||  || — || July 25, 2014 || Haleakala || Pan-STARRS ||  || align=right | 2.0 km || 
|-id=811 bgcolor=#d6d6d6
| 604811 ||  || — || September 19, 2003 || Kitt Peak || Spacewatch ||  || align=right | 2.9 km || 
|-id=812 bgcolor=#d6d6d6
| 604812 ||  || — || September 15, 2009 || Kitt Peak || Spacewatch ||  || align=right | 2.6 km || 
|-id=813 bgcolor=#d6d6d6
| 604813 ||  || — || August 31, 2005 || Kitt Peak || Spacewatch ||  || align=right | 1.5 km || 
|-id=814 bgcolor=#d6d6d6
| 604814 ||  || — || July 4, 2003 || Kitt Peak || Spacewatch ||  || align=right | 2.6 km || 
|-id=815 bgcolor=#E9E9E9
| 604815 ||  || — || October 8, 2015 || Haleakala || Pan-STARRS ||  || align=right | 1.3 km || 
|-id=816 bgcolor=#d6d6d6
| 604816 ||  || — || October 10, 2015 || Haleakala || Pan-STARRS ||  || align=right | 2.2 km || 
|-id=817 bgcolor=#d6d6d6
| 604817 ||  || — || May 31, 2014 || Haleakala || Pan-STARRS ||  || align=right | 1.8 km || 
|-id=818 bgcolor=#d6d6d6
| 604818 ||  || — || October 3, 2015 || Haleakala || Pan-STARRS ||  || align=right | 2.9 km || 
|-id=819 bgcolor=#d6d6d6
| 604819 ||  || — || October 10, 2015 || Haleakala || Pan-STARRS ||  || align=right | 3.1 km || 
|-id=820 bgcolor=#d6d6d6
| 604820 ||  || — || October 2, 2015 || Mount Lemmon || Mount Lemmon Survey ||  || align=right | 2.2 km || 
|-id=821 bgcolor=#d6d6d6
| 604821 ||  || — || September 28, 2003 || Apache Point || SDSS Collaboration ||  || align=right | 2.2 km || 
|-id=822 bgcolor=#d6d6d6
| 604822 ||  || — || October 12, 2015 || Haleakala || Pan-STARRS ||  || align=right | 2.2 km || 
|-id=823 bgcolor=#fefefe
| 604823 ||  || — || October 11, 2015 || Mount Lemmon || Mount Lemmon Survey ||  || align=right data-sort-value="0.56" | 560 m || 
|-id=824 bgcolor=#d6d6d6
| 604824 ||  || — || October 15, 2015 || Haleakala || Pan-STARRS ||  || align=right | 2.3 km || 
|-id=825 bgcolor=#d6d6d6
| 604825 ||  || — || October 12, 2015 || Haleakala || Pan-STARRS ||  || align=right | 2.2 km || 
|-id=826 bgcolor=#d6d6d6
| 604826 ||  || — || October 10, 2015 || Haleakala || Pan-STARRS ||  || align=right | 1.8 km || 
|-id=827 bgcolor=#fefefe
| 604827 Rietavas ||  ||  || October 11, 2015 || Baldone || I. Eglītis ||  || align=right data-sort-value="0.58" | 580 m || 
|-id=828 bgcolor=#d6d6d6
| 604828 ||  || — || October 9, 2015 || Haleakala || Pan-STARRS ||  || align=right | 2.1 km || 
|-id=829 bgcolor=#d6d6d6
| 604829 ||  || — || April 10, 2013 || Haleakala || Pan-STARRS ||  || align=right | 2.5 km || 
|-id=830 bgcolor=#d6d6d6
| 604830 ||  || — || October 18, 2015 || Haleakala || Pan-STARRS ||  || align=right | 1.9 km || 
|-id=831 bgcolor=#d6d6d6
| 604831 ||  || — || June 24, 2008 || Kitt Peak || Spacewatch ||  || align=right | 2.6 km || 
|-id=832 bgcolor=#d6d6d6
| 604832 ||  || — || February 25, 2012 || Mount Lemmon || Mount Lemmon Survey ||  || align=right | 2.4 km || 
|-id=833 bgcolor=#d6d6d6
| 604833 ||  || — || September 27, 2003 || Kitt Peak || Spacewatch ||  || align=right | 2.5 km || 
|-id=834 bgcolor=#d6d6d6
| 604834 ||  || — || April 16, 2013 || Haleakala || Pan-STARRS ||  || align=right | 2.8 km || 
|-id=835 bgcolor=#d6d6d6
| 604835 ||  || — || November 15, 2010 || Kitt Peak || Spacewatch ||  || align=right | 2.5 km || 
|-id=836 bgcolor=#d6d6d6
| 604836 ||  || — || August 12, 2015 || Haleakala || Pan-STARRS ||  || align=right | 2.4 km || 
|-id=837 bgcolor=#d6d6d6
| 604837 ||  || — || September 23, 2015 || Haleakala || Pan-STARRS ||  || align=right | 2.1 km || 
|-id=838 bgcolor=#d6d6d6
| 604838 ||  || — || September 23, 2015 || Haleakala || Pan-STARRS ||  || align=right | 2.2 km || 
|-id=839 bgcolor=#d6d6d6
| 604839 ||  || — || August 18, 2009 || Kitt Peak || Spacewatch ||  || align=right | 2.3 km || 
|-id=840 bgcolor=#d6d6d6
| 604840 ||  || — || July 2, 2014 || Haleakala || Pan-STARRS ||  || align=right | 2.4 km || 
|-id=841 bgcolor=#d6d6d6
| 604841 ||  || — || September 9, 2015 || Haleakala || Pan-STARRS ||  || align=right | 2.4 km || 
|-id=842 bgcolor=#d6d6d6
| 604842 ||  || — || March 2, 2006 || Kitt Peak || Spacewatch ||  || align=right | 2.5 km || 
|-id=843 bgcolor=#E9E9E9
| 604843 ||  || — || August 21, 2015 || Haleakala || Pan-STARRS ||  || align=right | 1.8 km || 
|-id=844 bgcolor=#d6d6d6
| 604844 ||  || — || August 28, 2009 || Kitt Peak || Spacewatch ||  || align=right | 2.0 km || 
|-id=845 bgcolor=#E9E9E9
| 604845 ||  || — || November 23, 2011 || Kitt Peak || Spacewatch ||  || align=right data-sort-value="0.97" | 970 m || 
|-id=846 bgcolor=#d6d6d6
| 604846 ||  || — || December 25, 2010 || Mount Lemmon || Mount Lemmon Survey ||  || align=right | 2.7 km || 
|-id=847 bgcolor=#fefefe
| 604847 ||  || — || August 12, 2015 || Haleakala || Pan-STARRS ||  || align=right data-sort-value="0.66" | 660 m || 
|-id=848 bgcolor=#d6d6d6
| 604848 ||  || — || August 12, 2015 || Haleakala || Pan-STARRS ||  || align=right | 2.0 km || 
|-id=849 bgcolor=#d6d6d6
| 604849 ||  || — || September 18, 2009 || Mount Lemmon || Mount Lemmon Survey ||  || align=right | 2.1 km || 
|-id=850 bgcolor=#d6d6d6
| 604850 ||  || — || January 30, 2012 || Mount Lemmon || Mount Lemmon Survey ||  || align=right | 2.5 km || 
|-id=851 bgcolor=#d6d6d6
| 604851 ||  || — || June 28, 2014 || Haleakala || Pan-STARRS || 7:4 || align=right | 2.5 km || 
|-id=852 bgcolor=#d6d6d6
| 604852 ||  || — || August 20, 2009 || Kitt Peak || Spacewatch ||  || align=right | 2.8 km || 
|-id=853 bgcolor=#d6d6d6
| 604853 ||  || — || September 17, 2009 || Catalina || CSS ||  || align=right | 3.0 km || 
|-id=854 bgcolor=#d6d6d6
| 604854 ||  || — || October 28, 2010 || Mount Lemmon || Mount Lemmon Survey ||  || align=right | 3.0 km || 
|-id=855 bgcolor=#d6d6d6
| 604855 ||  || — || October 31, 2010 || Piszkesteto || Z. Kuli, K. Sárneczky ||  || align=right | 3.0 km || 
|-id=856 bgcolor=#E9E9E9
| 604856 ||  || — || September 23, 2015 || Haleakala || Pan-STARRS ||  || align=right | 1.5 km || 
|-id=857 bgcolor=#E9E9E9
| 604857 ||  || — || August 12, 2015 || Haleakala || Pan-STARRS ||  || align=right | 1.4 km || 
|-id=858 bgcolor=#d6d6d6
| 604858 ||  || — || September 20, 2015 || Mount Lemmon || Mount Lemmon Survey ||  || align=right | 2.3 km || 
|-id=859 bgcolor=#d6d6d6
| 604859 ||  || — || November 6, 2010 || Mount Lemmon || Mount Lemmon Survey ||  || align=right | 2.3 km || 
|-id=860 bgcolor=#d6d6d6
| 604860 ||  || — || March 15, 2007 || Kitt Peak || Spacewatch ||  || align=right | 2.7 km || 
|-id=861 bgcolor=#d6d6d6
| 604861 ||  || — || November 8, 2010 || Mount Lemmon || Mount Lemmon Survey ||  || align=right | 2.7 km || 
|-id=862 bgcolor=#d6d6d6
| 604862 ||  || — || August 12, 2015 || Haleakala || Pan-STARRS ||  || align=right | 2.8 km || 
|-id=863 bgcolor=#E9E9E9
| 604863 ||  || — || May 26, 2014 || Haleakala || Pan-STARRS ||  || align=right | 2.6 km || 
|-id=864 bgcolor=#d6d6d6
| 604864 ||  || — || October 24, 2015 || Haleakala || Pan-STARRS ||  || align=right | 2.4 km || 
|-id=865 bgcolor=#d6d6d6
| 604865 ||  || — || September 30, 2003 || Kitt Peak || Spacewatch ||  || align=right | 2.9 km || 
|-id=866 bgcolor=#d6d6d6
| 604866 ||  || — || January 8, 2011 || Mount Lemmon || Mount Lemmon Survey ||  || align=right | 2.9 km || 
|-id=867 bgcolor=#d6d6d6
| 604867 ||  || — || August 20, 2009 || Kitt Peak || Spacewatch ||  || align=right | 2.5 km || 
|-id=868 bgcolor=#E9E9E9
| 604868 ||  || — || May 23, 2014 || Haleakala || Pan-STARRS ||  || align=right | 1.5 km || 
|-id=869 bgcolor=#E9E9E9
| 604869 ||  || — || October 21, 2015 || Haleakala || Pan-STARRS ||  || align=right | 1.8 km || 
|-id=870 bgcolor=#d6d6d6
| 604870 ||  || — || October 24, 2015 || Mount Lemmon || Mount Lemmon Survey ||  || align=right | 2.2 km || 
|-id=871 bgcolor=#d6d6d6
| 604871 ||  || — || October 23, 2015 || Mount Lemmon || Mount Lemmon Survey ||  || align=right | 2.5 km || 
|-id=872 bgcolor=#d6d6d6
| 604872 ||  || — || October 23, 2015 || Mount Lemmon || Mount Lemmon Survey ||  || align=right | 2.3 km || 
|-id=873 bgcolor=#d6d6d6
| 604873 ||  || — || October 16, 2015 || Mount Lemmon || Mount Lemmon Survey ||  || align=right | 2.0 km || 
|-id=874 bgcolor=#fefefe
| 604874 ||  || — || December 10, 2002 || Socorro || LINEAR || H || align=right data-sort-value="0.79" | 790 m || 
|-id=875 bgcolor=#d6d6d6
| 604875 ||  || — || April 3, 2008 || Mount Lemmon || Mount Lemmon Survey ||  || align=right | 3.0 km || 
|-id=876 bgcolor=#d6d6d6
| 604876 ||  || — || August 9, 2015 || Haleakala || Pan-STARRS ||  || align=right | 2.1 km || 
|-id=877 bgcolor=#d6d6d6
| 604877 ||  || — || September 9, 2015 || Haleakala || Pan-STARRS || Tj (2.98) || align=right | 2.3 km || 
|-id=878 bgcolor=#E9E9E9
| 604878 ||  || — || February 1, 2012 || Kitt Peak || Spacewatch ||  || align=right | 1.7 km || 
|-id=879 bgcolor=#E9E9E9
| 604879 ||  || — || April 28, 2014 || Haleakala || Pan-STARRS ||  || align=right | 1.3 km || 
|-id=880 bgcolor=#d6d6d6
| 604880 ||  || — || March 8, 2013 || Haleakala || Pan-STARRS ||  || align=right | 2.6 km || 
|-id=881 bgcolor=#fefefe
| 604881 ||  || — || November 3, 2007 || Mount Lemmon || Mount Lemmon Survey || H || align=right data-sort-value="0.56" | 560 m || 
|-id=882 bgcolor=#d6d6d6
| 604882 ||  || — || February 4, 2006 || Junk Bond || D. Healy ||  || align=right | 1.9 km || 
|-id=883 bgcolor=#d6d6d6
| 604883 ||  || — || September 22, 2009 || Kitt Peak || Spacewatch ||  || align=right | 2.7 km || 
|-id=884 bgcolor=#d6d6d6
| 604884 ||  || — || August 19, 2009 || Kitt Peak || Spacewatch ||  || align=right | 2.4 km || 
|-id=885 bgcolor=#d6d6d6
| 604885 ||  || — || July 23, 2015 || Haleakala || Pan-STARRS ||  || align=right | 2.2 km || 
|-id=886 bgcolor=#d6d6d6
| 604886 ||  || — || January 27, 2007 || Kitt Peak || Spacewatch ||  || align=right | 2.8 km || 
|-id=887 bgcolor=#d6d6d6
| 604887 ||  || — || February 16, 2007 || Palomar || NEAT ||  || align=right | 2.6 km || 
|-id=888 bgcolor=#E9E9E9
| 604888 ||  || — || July 25, 2015 || Haleakala || Pan-STARRS ||  || align=right | 1.4 km || 
|-id=889 bgcolor=#E9E9E9
| 604889 ||  || — || September 30, 2006 || Mount Lemmon || Mount Lemmon Survey ||  || align=right | 1.7 km || 
|-id=890 bgcolor=#E9E9E9
| 604890 ||  || — || May 7, 2014 || Haleakala || Pan-STARRS ||  || align=right | 1.5 km || 
|-id=891 bgcolor=#d6d6d6
| 604891 ||  || — || October 14, 2015 || Kitt Peak || Spacewatch ||  || align=right | 2.4 km || 
|-id=892 bgcolor=#d6d6d6
| 604892 ||  || — || December 2, 2010 || Kitt Peak || Spacewatch ||  || align=right | 2.7 km || 
|-id=893 bgcolor=#d6d6d6
| 604893 ||  || — || October 12, 2015 || Haleakala || Pan-STARRS ||  || align=right | 2.3 km || 
|-id=894 bgcolor=#d6d6d6
| 604894 ||  || — || June 24, 2014 || Haleakala || Pan-STARRS ||  || align=right | 2.1 km || 
|-id=895 bgcolor=#d6d6d6
| 604895 ||  || — || September 21, 2009 || Kitt Peak || Spacewatch ||  || align=right | 2.0 km || 
|-id=896 bgcolor=#d6d6d6
| 604896 ||  || — || October 30, 2005 || Mount Lemmon || Mount Lemmon Survey ||  || align=right | 3.6 km || 
|-id=897 bgcolor=#E9E9E9
| 604897 ||  || — || September 8, 2002 || Haleakala || AMOS ||  || align=right | 1.1 km || 
|-id=898 bgcolor=#d6d6d6
| 604898 ||  || — || December 13, 2010 || Mount Lemmon || Mount Lemmon Survey ||  || align=right | 2.6 km || 
|-id=899 bgcolor=#d6d6d6
| 604899 ||  || — || November 15, 2010 || Mount Lemmon || Mount Lemmon Survey ||  || align=right | 2.4 km || 
|-id=900 bgcolor=#d6d6d6
| 604900 ||  || — || September 23, 2015 || Haleakala || Pan-STARRS ||  || align=right | 2.2 km || 
|}

604901–605000 

|-bgcolor=#d6d6d6
| 604901 ||  || — || June 5, 2014 || Haleakala || Pan-STARRS ||  || align=right | 2.1 km || 
|-id=902 bgcolor=#E9E9E9
| 604902 ||  || — || April 16, 2005 || Kitt Peak || Spacewatch ||  || align=right | 1.7 km || 
|-id=903 bgcolor=#FA8072
| 604903 ||  || — || October 16, 2015 || Mount Lemmon || Mount Lemmon Survey || H || align=right data-sort-value="0.40" | 400 m || 
|-id=904 bgcolor=#FA8072
| 604904 ||  || — || September 12, 2015 || Haleakala || Pan-STARRS || H || align=right data-sort-value="0.62" | 620 m || 
|-id=905 bgcolor=#d6d6d6
| 604905 ||  || — || August 17, 2009 || Catalina || CSS ||  || align=right | 3.4 km || 
|-id=906 bgcolor=#E9E9E9
| 604906 ||  || — || September 30, 2003 || Kitt Peak || Spacewatch ||  || align=right data-sort-value="0.67" | 670 m || 
|-id=907 bgcolor=#d6d6d6
| 604907 ||  || — || November 3, 2015 || Space Surveillance || Space Surveillance Telescope ||  || align=right | 3.3 km || 
|-id=908 bgcolor=#E9E9E9
| 604908 ||  || — || August 12, 2010 || Kitt Peak || Spacewatch ||  || align=right | 2.0 km || 
|-id=909 bgcolor=#d6d6d6
| 604909 ||  || — || October 13, 2010 || Catalina || CSS ||  || align=right | 3.1 km || 
|-id=910 bgcolor=#d6d6d6
| 604910 ||  || — || September 9, 2015 || Haleakala || Pan-STARRS ||  || align=right | 2.5 km || 
|-id=911 bgcolor=#d6d6d6
| 604911 ||  || — || March 20, 2007 || Anderson Mesa || LONEOS ||  || align=right | 3.9 km || 
|-id=912 bgcolor=#d6d6d6
| 604912 ||  || — || August 29, 2009 || Catalina || CSS ||  || align=right | 2.7 km || 
|-id=913 bgcolor=#d6d6d6
| 604913 ||  || — || August 27, 2009 || Catalina || CSS ||  || align=right | 3.3 km || 
|-id=914 bgcolor=#fefefe
| 604914 ||  || — || August 12, 2015 || Haleakala || Pan-STARRS ||  || align=right data-sort-value="0.75" | 750 m || 
|-id=915 bgcolor=#d6d6d6
| 604915 ||  || — || August 27, 2005 || Palomar || NEAT ||  || align=right | 3.2 km || 
|-id=916 bgcolor=#d6d6d6
| 604916 ||  || — || June 29, 2014 || Haleakala || Pan-STARRS ||  || align=right | 2.5 km || 
|-id=917 bgcolor=#E9E9E9
| 604917 ||  || — || November 9, 2007 || Mount Lemmon || Mount Lemmon Survey ||  || align=right | 1.7 km || 
|-id=918 bgcolor=#d6d6d6
| 604918 ||  || — || November 6, 2004 || Palomar || NEAT ||  || align=right | 3.9 km || 
|-id=919 bgcolor=#d6d6d6
| 604919 ||  || — || November 12, 2010 || Mount Lemmon || Mount Lemmon Survey ||  || align=right | 2.1 km || 
|-id=920 bgcolor=#d6d6d6
| 604920 ||  || — || April 18, 2007 || Mount Lemmon || Mount Lemmon Survey ||  || align=right | 2.8 km || 
|-id=921 bgcolor=#d6d6d6
| 604921 ||  || — || September 15, 2009 || Mount Lemmon || Mount Lemmon Survey ||  || align=right | 2.2 km || 
|-id=922 bgcolor=#fefefe
| 604922 ||  || — || November 3, 2015 || Mount Lemmon || Mount Lemmon Survey || H || align=right data-sort-value="0.48" | 480 m || 
|-id=923 bgcolor=#d6d6d6
| 604923 ||  || — || February 11, 2000 || Kitt Peak || Spacewatch ||  || align=right | 2.7 km || 
|-id=924 bgcolor=#fefefe
| 604924 ||  || — || October 26, 2012 || Mount Lemmon || Mount Lemmon Survey ||  || align=right data-sort-value="0.56" | 560 m || 
|-id=925 bgcolor=#d6d6d6
| 604925 ||  || — || January 30, 2011 || Haleakala || Pan-STARRS ||  || align=right | 2.1 km || 
|-id=926 bgcolor=#d6d6d6
| 604926 ||  || — || November 1, 2015 || Mount Lemmon || Mount Lemmon Survey ||  || align=right | 2.8 km || 
|-id=927 bgcolor=#d6d6d6
| 604927 ||  || — || November 7, 2015 || Haleakala || Pan-STARRS ||  || align=right | 2.1 km || 
|-id=928 bgcolor=#E9E9E9
| 604928 ||  || — || October 24, 2011 || Haleakala || Pan-STARRS ||  || align=right | 1.5 km || 
|-id=929 bgcolor=#E9E9E9
| 604929 ||  || — || May 8, 2014 || Haleakala || Pan-STARRS ||  || align=right data-sort-value="0.77" | 770 m || 
|-id=930 bgcolor=#d6d6d6
| 604930 ||  || — || October 2, 2009 || Mount Lemmon || Mount Lemmon Survey ||  || align=right | 4.0 km || 
|-id=931 bgcolor=#d6d6d6
| 604931 ||  || — || November 21, 2015 || Mount Lemmon || Mount Lemmon Survey ||  || align=right | 1.6 km || 
|-id=932 bgcolor=#d6d6d6
| 604932 ||  || — || October 10, 2015 || Haleakala || Pan-STARRS ||  || align=right | 2.4 km || 
|-id=933 bgcolor=#d6d6d6
| 604933 ||  || — || July 25, 2015 || Haleakala || Pan-STARRS ||  || align=right | 2.5 km || 
|-id=934 bgcolor=#d6d6d6
| 604934 ||  || — || December 1, 2005 || Kitt Peak || Spacewatch ||  || align=right | 3.2 km || 
|-id=935 bgcolor=#d6d6d6
| 604935 ||  || — || August 16, 2009 || Kitt Peak || Spacewatch ||  || align=right | 1.9 km || 
|-id=936 bgcolor=#d6d6d6
| 604936 ||  || — || November 10, 2015 || Catalina || CSS ||  || align=right | 2.3 km || 
|-id=937 bgcolor=#d6d6d6
| 604937 ||  || — || September 9, 2015 || Haleakala || Pan-STARRS ||  || align=right | 2.0 km || 
|-id=938 bgcolor=#d6d6d6
| 604938 ||  || — || March 25, 2007 || Mount Lemmon || Mount Lemmon Survey ||  || align=right | 2.7 km || 
|-id=939 bgcolor=#d6d6d6
| 604939 ||  || — || September 22, 2009 || Kitt Peak || Spacewatch ||  || align=right | 1.9 km || 
|-id=940 bgcolor=#d6d6d6
| 604940 ||  || — || October 21, 2015 || Haleakala || Pan-STARRS ||  || align=right | 2.7 km || 
|-id=941 bgcolor=#E9E9E9
| 604941 ||  || — || March 31, 2008 || Mount Lemmon || Mount Lemmon Survey ||  || align=right | 2.0 km || 
|-id=942 bgcolor=#d6d6d6
| 604942 ||  || — || September 6, 2004 || Needville || Needville Obs. ||  || align=right | 2.0 km || 
|-id=943 bgcolor=#fefefe
| 604943 ||  || — || October 26, 2008 || Mount Lemmon || Mount Lemmon Survey ||  || align=right data-sort-value="0.73" | 730 m || 
|-id=944 bgcolor=#d6d6d6
| 604944 ||  || — || December 4, 2015 || Haleakala || Pan-STARRS || 7:4 || align=right | 2.5 km || 
|-id=945 bgcolor=#d6d6d6
| 604945 ||  || — || December 1, 2015 || Haleakala || Pan-STARRS ||  || align=right | 2.4 km || 
|-id=946 bgcolor=#d6d6d6
| 604946 ||  || — || July 28, 2014 || Haleakala || Pan-STARRS ||  || align=right | 2.0 km || 
|-id=947 bgcolor=#E9E9E9
| 604947 ||  || — || December 4, 2015 || Haleakala || Pan-STARRS ||  || align=right | 1.4 km || 
|-id=948 bgcolor=#d6d6d6
| 604948 ||  || — || July 31, 2014 || Haleakala || Pan-STARRS ||  || align=right | 2.4 km || 
|-id=949 bgcolor=#fefefe
| 604949 ||  || — || November 8, 2015 || Mount Lemmon || Mount Lemmon Survey || H || align=right data-sort-value="0.55" | 550 m || 
|-id=950 bgcolor=#d6d6d6
| 604950 ||  || — || June 18, 2014 || Mount Lemmon || Mount Lemmon Survey ||  || align=right | 2.1 km || 
|-id=951 bgcolor=#d6d6d6
| 604951 ||  || — || July 6, 2003 || Kitt Peak || Spacewatch ||  || align=right | 3.0 km || 
|-id=952 bgcolor=#d6d6d6
| 604952 ||  || — || July 8, 2014 || Haleakala || Pan-STARRS ||  || align=right | 2.7 km || 
|-id=953 bgcolor=#d6d6d6
| 604953 ||  || — || November 7, 2015 || Mount Lemmon || Mount Lemmon Survey ||  || align=right | 2.2 km || 
|-id=954 bgcolor=#d6d6d6
| 604954 ||  || — || October 1, 2008 || Mount Lemmon || Mount Lemmon Survey || 7:4 || align=right | 2.3 km || 
|-id=955 bgcolor=#d6d6d6
| 604955 ||  || — || September 20, 2014 || Mount Lemmon || Mount Lemmon Survey || 7:4 || align=right | 2.7 km || 
|-id=956 bgcolor=#d6d6d6
| 604956 ||  || — || August 28, 2014 || Haleakala || Pan-STARRS || 7:4 || align=right | 2.7 km || 
|-id=957 bgcolor=#d6d6d6
| 604957 ||  || — || December 10, 2010 || Mount Lemmon || Mount Lemmon Survey ||  || align=right | 2.7 km || 
|-id=958 bgcolor=#d6d6d6
| 604958 ||  || — || September 29, 2008 || Mount Lemmon || Mount Lemmon Survey || 7:4 || align=right | 3.0 km || 
|-id=959 bgcolor=#E9E9E9
| 604959 ||  || — || February 7, 2008 || Kitt Peak || Spacewatch ||  || align=right | 1.4 km || 
|-id=960 bgcolor=#d6d6d6
| 604960 ||  || — || July 28, 2014 || Haleakala || Pan-STARRS ||  || align=right | 2.5 km || 
|-id=961 bgcolor=#E9E9E9
| 604961 ||  || — || January 18, 2012 || Mount Lemmon || Mount Lemmon Survey ||  || align=right | 1.5 km || 
|-id=962 bgcolor=#d6d6d6
| 604962 ||  || — || March 25, 2012 || Mount Lemmon || Mount Lemmon Survey ||  || align=right | 2.5 km || 
|-id=963 bgcolor=#d6d6d6
| 604963 ||  || — || October 22, 2003 || Kitt Peak || Spacewatch ||  || align=right | 2.4 km || 
|-id=964 bgcolor=#FA8072
| 604964 ||  || — || September 23, 2015 || Haleakala || Pan-STARRS ||  || align=right | 1.0 km || 
|-id=965 bgcolor=#d6d6d6
| 604965 ||  || — || September 10, 2015 || Haleakala || Pan-STARRS ||  || align=right | 2.8 km || 
|-id=966 bgcolor=#d6d6d6
| 604966 ||  || — || July 27, 2014 || Haleakala || Pan-STARRS ||  || align=right | 2.2 km || 
|-id=967 bgcolor=#d6d6d6
| 604967 ||  || — || September 23, 2015 || Haleakala || Pan-STARRS ||  || align=right | 2.3 km || 
|-id=968 bgcolor=#fefefe
| 604968 ||  || — || March 15, 2004 || Kitt Peak || Spacewatch ||  || align=right data-sort-value="0.48" | 480 m || 
|-id=969 bgcolor=#E9E9E9
| 604969 ||  || — || January 18, 2012 || Mount Lemmon || Mount Lemmon Survey ||  || align=right | 1.8 km || 
|-id=970 bgcolor=#d6d6d6
| 604970 ||  || — || November 4, 2004 || Kitt Peak || Spacewatch ||  || align=right | 4.5 km || 
|-id=971 bgcolor=#d6d6d6
| 604971 ||  || — || December 11, 2010 || Mount Lemmon || Mount Lemmon Survey ||  || align=right | 2.8 km || 
|-id=972 bgcolor=#E9E9E9
| 604972 ||  || — || August 30, 2006 || Anderson Mesa || LONEOS ||  || align=right | 1.7 km || 
|-id=973 bgcolor=#d6d6d6
| 604973 ||  || — || April 16, 2012 || Bergisch Gladbach || W. Bickel ||  || align=right | 2.2 km || 
|-id=974 bgcolor=#d6d6d6
| 604974 ||  || — || August 17, 2009 || Kitt Peak || Spacewatch ||  || align=right | 2.1 km || 
|-id=975 bgcolor=#d6d6d6
| 604975 ||  || — || December 6, 2015 || Mount Lemmon || Mount Lemmon Survey ||  || align=right | 2.2 km || 
|-id=976 bgcolor=#d6d6d6
| 604976 ||  || — || December 24, 2006 || Mount Lemmon || Mount Lemmon Survey ||  || align=right | 4.4 km || 
|-id=977 bgcolor=#d6d6d6
| 604977 ||  || — || November 22, 2015 || Mount Lemmon || Mount Lemmon Survey ||  || align=right | 2.1 km || 
|-id=978 bgcolor=#d6d6d6
| 604978 ||  || — || January 29, 2011 || Mayhill-ISON || L. Elenin ||  || align=right | 2.4 km || 
|-id=979 bgcolor=#d6d6d6
| 604979 ||  || — || November 18, 2015 || Kitt Peak || Spacewatch ||  || align=right | 2.5 km || 
|-id=980 bgcolor=#d6d6d6
| 604980 ||  || — || July 25, 2014 || Haleakala || Pan-STARRS ||  || align=right | 1.9 km || 
|-id=981 bgcolor=#d6d6d6
| 604981 ||  || — || June 28, 2014 || Haleakala || Pan-STARRS ||  || align=right | 2.8 km || 
|-id=982 bgcolor=#fefefe
| 604982 ||  || — || December 6, 2015 || Haleakala || Pan-STARRS ||  || align=right data-sort-value="0.55" | 550 m || 
|-id=983 bgcolor=#d6d6d6
| 604983 ||  || — || September 2, 2014 || Haleakala || Pan-STARRS ||  || align=right | 2.4 km || 
|-id=984 bgcolor=#fefefe
| 604984 ||  || — || October 11, 2005 || Kitt Peak || Spacewatch ||  || align=right data-sort-value="0.48" | 480 m || 
|-id=985 bgcolor=#d6d6d6
| 604985 ||  || — || August 23, 2014 || Haleakala || Pan-STARRS ||  || align=right | 2.4 km || 
|-id=986 bgcolor=#d6d6d6
| 604986 ||  || — || April 11, 2013 || Oukaimeden || C. Rinner ||  || align=right | 3.5 km || 
|-id=987 bgcolor=#d6d6d6
| 604987 ||  || — || December 8, 2015 || Mount Lemmon || Mount Lemmon Survey ||  || align=right | 2.4 km || 
|-id=988 bgcolor=#d6d6d6
| 604988 ||  || — || June 7, 2013 || Haleakala || Pan-STARRS ||  || align=right | 1.9 km || 
|-id=989 bgcolor=#fefefe
| 604989 ||  || — || September 3, 2008 || Kitt Peak || Spacewatch ||  || align=right data-sort-value="0.53" | 530 m || 
|-id=990 bgcolor=#d6d6d6
| 604990 ||  || — || July 8, 2014 || Haleakala || Pan-STARRS ||  || align=right | 2.0 km || 
|-id=991 bgcolor=#d6d6d6
| 604991 ||  || — || June 28, 2014 || Haleakala || Pan-STARRS ||  || align=right | 2.4 km || 
|-id=992 bgcolor=#d6d6d6
| 604992 ||  || — || January 4, 2011 || Mount Lemmon || Mount Lemmon Survey ||  || align=right | 2.5 km || 
|-id=993 bgcolor=#d6d6d6
| 604993 ||  || — || December 8, 2015 || Haleakala || Pan-STARRS ||  || align=right | 2.0 km || 
|-id=994 bgcolor=#d6d6d6
| 604994 ||  || — || December 8, 2010 || Mount Lemmon || Mount Lemmon Survey ||  || align=right | 2.3 km || 
|-id=995 bgcolor=#fefefe
| 604995 ||  || — || July 29, 2008 || Kitt Peak || Spacewatch ||  || align=right data-sort-value="0.62" | 620 m || 
|-id=996 bgcolor=#d6d6d6
| 604996 ||  || — || May 6, 2002 || Kitt Peak || Spacewatch || Tj (2.97) || align=right | 2.7 km || 
|-id=997 bgcolor=#fefefe
| 604997 ||  || — || December 12, 2015 || Haleakala || Pan-STARRS ||  || align=right data-sort-value="0.83" | 830 m || 
|-id=998 bgcolor=#d6d6d6
| 604998 ||  || — || August 28, 2014 || Haleakala || Pan-STARRS ||  || align=right | 2.2 km || 
|-id=999 bgcolor=#E9E9E9
| 604999 ||  || — || December 9, 2015 || Haleakala || Pan-STARRS ||  || align=right | 1.9 km || 
|-id=000 bgcolor=#d6d6d6
| 605000 ||  || — || December 4, 2015 || Mount Lemmon || Mount Lemmon Survey ||  || align=right | 2.1 km || 
|}

References

External links 
 Discovery Circumstances: Numbered Minor Planets (600001)–(605000) (IAU Minor Planet Center)

0604